= Anglicana =

Anglicana (Latin: English) may refer to:

- Church of England or Anglicanism, from Latin Ecclesia Anglicana
- Anglicana or Cursiva Anglicana, the more informal English forms of Gothic or Blackletter used from the 13th to 15th centuries
- Anglicana or Bastarda Anglicana, the English form of bastard Gothic or Blackletter
- Anglicana or court hand, a style of handwriting developed from this, used as late as the 18th century in English courts of law
- Anglicana (album), a 2002 release by English folk musician Eliza Carthy
- Lyra Anglicana ("The English Lyre"), an influential hymnal of the 19th-century Oxford Movement by Robert Hall Baynes
- Monumenta Anglicana ("English Monuments"), a work on English antiquities by John Le Neve

== See also ==
- English (disambiguation)
