= Rotunda (script) =

Medieval blackletter script

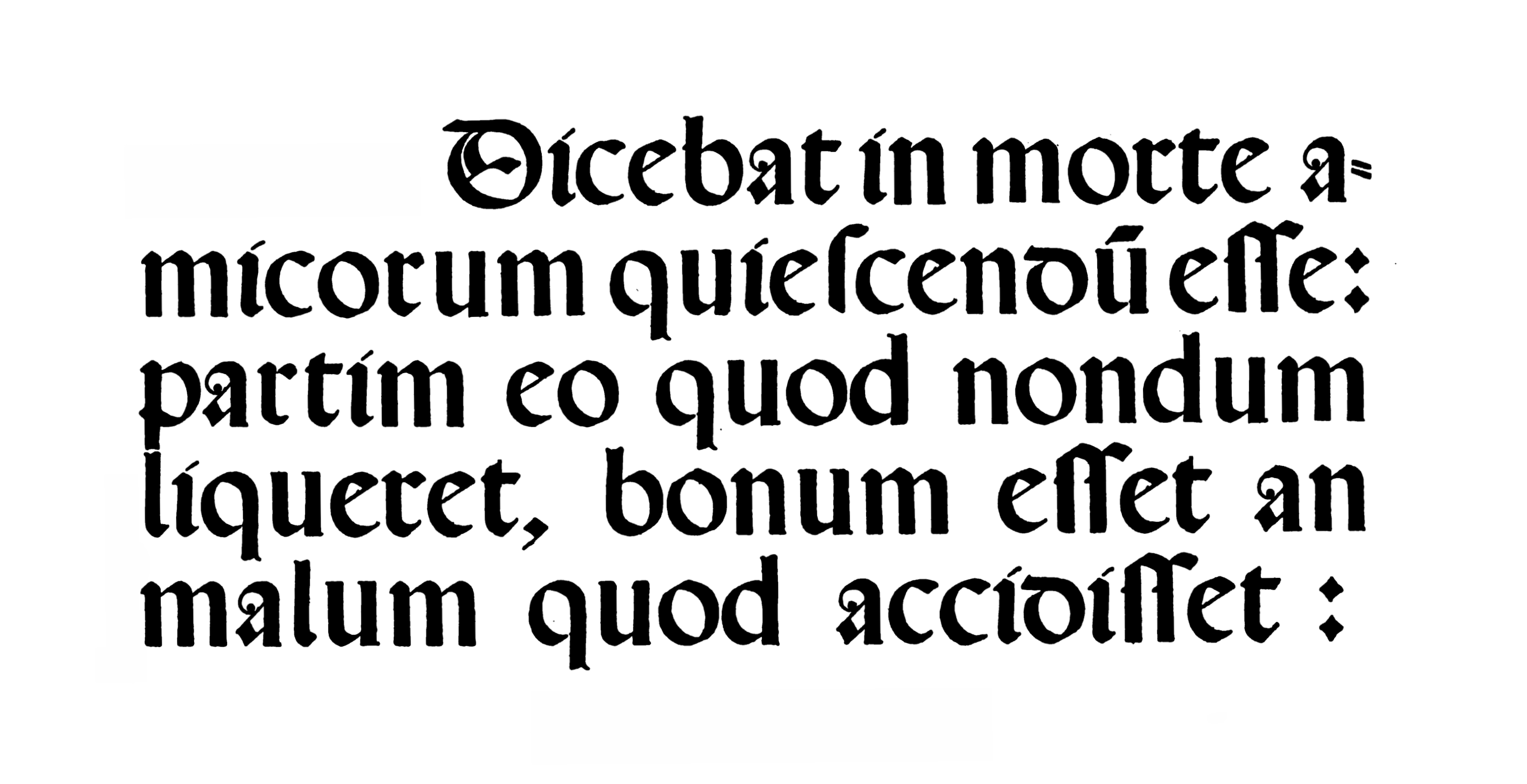
A 1570s rotunda typeface cut by Hendrik van den Keere for printer Christophe Plantin

Rotunda is a medieval blackletter script used mainly in Italy. It is characterized by its roundness as opposed to the more angular blackletter scrips such as Fraktur.

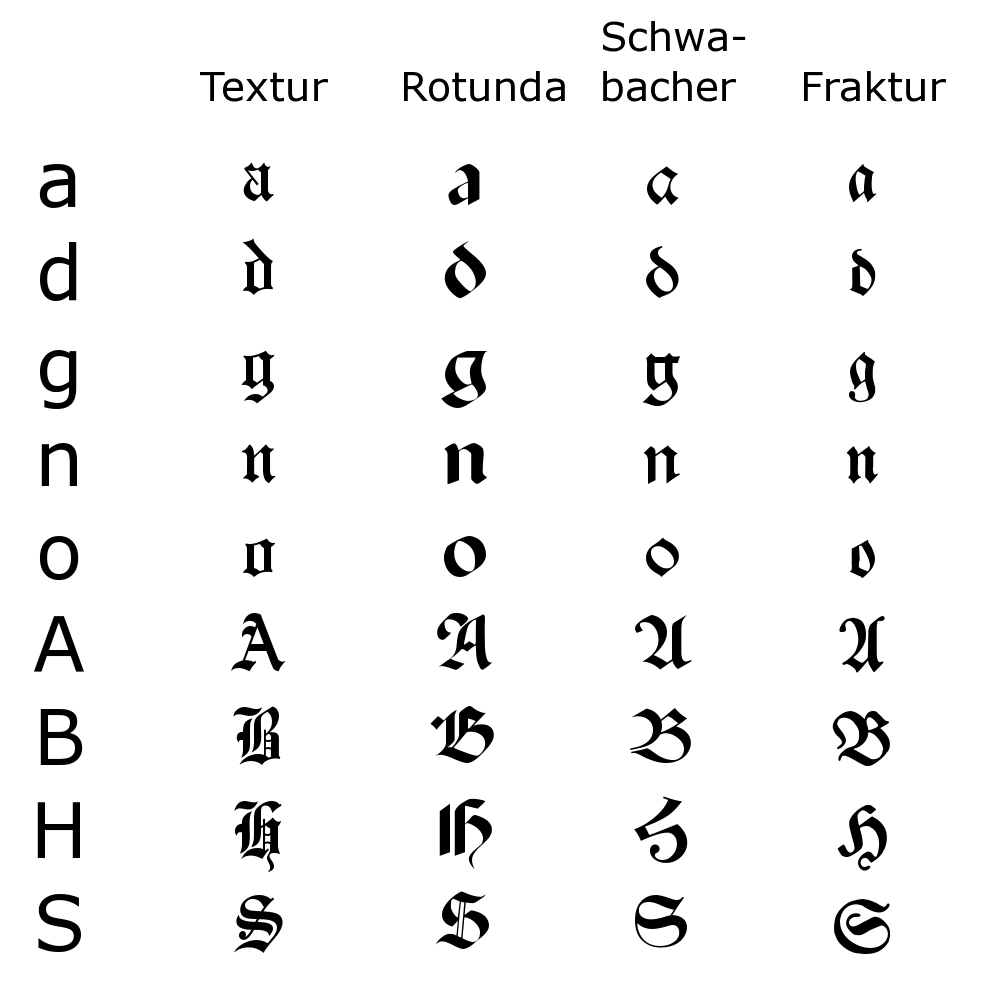
Overview on some blackletter typefaces

The most usual form of Italian rotunda was littera bononiensis, used at the University of Bologna in the 13th century. Biting is a common feature in Italian rotunda, but breaking is not.

== See also ==
- Asemic writing
- Bastarda
- Blackletter
- Book hand
- Calligraphy
- Chancery hand
- Court hand (a.k.a. cursiva antiquior)
- Cursive
- Hand (writing style)
- Handwriting
- History of writing
- Italic script
- Law hand
- Palaeography
- Penmanship
- Ronde script (calligraphy)
- Round hand
- Secretary hand
