= Italic script =

Style of handwriting and calligraphy developed in Italy

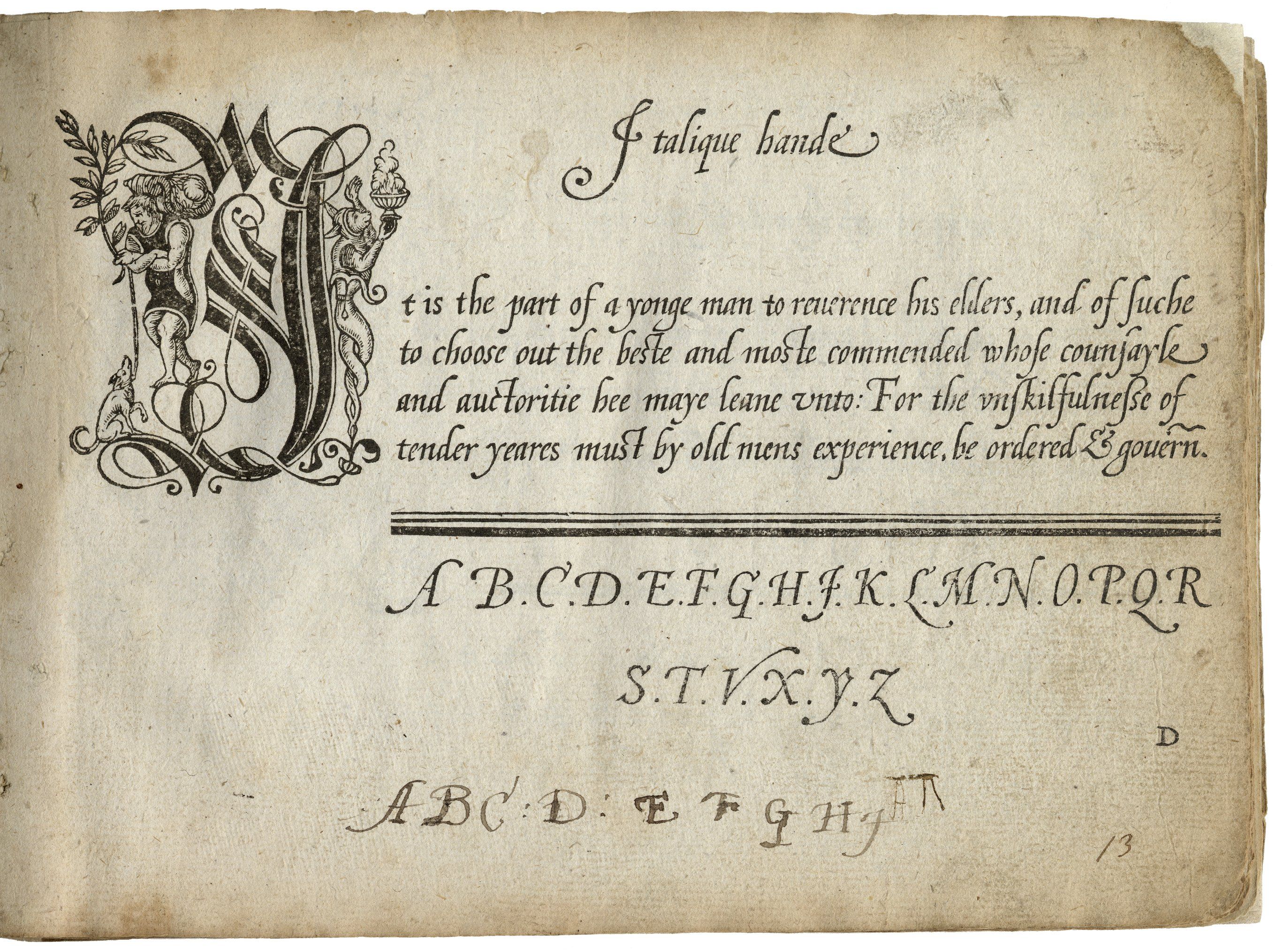
Example page of the "Italique Hande" from a copy of A booke containing diuers sortes of hands... first published in 1570.

Italic script, also known as chancery cursive and Italic hand, is a semi-cursive, slightly sloped style of handwriting and calligraphy that was developed during the Renaissance in Italy. It is one of the most popular styles used in contemporary Western calligraphy.

Italic script is considered one of the best examples of Latin cursive writing, and had a great influence on the calligraphic styles that followed throughout Europe.

== History ==
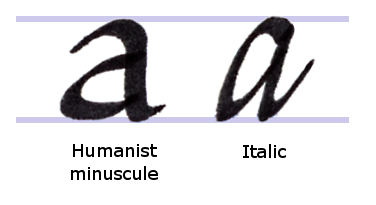
One of the innovations of Niccoli's Italic script was the major change to the Humanist minuscule a.

Italic script is based largely on Humanist minuscule, which itself draws on Carolingian minuscule. The capital letters are the same as the Humanist capitals, modeled on Roman square capitals. The Italian scholar Niccolò de' Niccoli was dissatisfied with the lowercase forms of Humanist minuscule, finding it too slow to write. In response, he created the Italic script, which incorporates features and techniques characteristic of a quickly written hand: oblique forms, fewer strokes per character, and the joining of letters. Perhaps the most significant change to any single character was to the form of the a, which he simplified from the two-story form to the one-story form ⟨ɑ⟩ now common to most handwriting styles.

Under the influence of Italic movable type used with printing presses, the style of handwritten Italic script moved toward disjoined, more mannered characters. By the 1550s the Italic script had become so laborious that it fell out of use with scribes.

The style became increasingly influenced by the development of Copperplate writing styles in the eighteenth century. The style of Italic script used today is often heavily influenced by developments made as late as the early 20th century. In the past few decades, the italic script has been promoted in English-speaking countries as an easier-to-learn alternative to traditional styles of cursive handwriting.

In the UK this revival was due in part to the 19th-century artist William Morris. In 1905 Monica Bridges’ book, A New Handwriting for Teachers was published. She was a skilled calligrapher and this book is credited with making italic handwriting fashionable in British schools.

A modern version called Getty-Dubay Italic was introduced in 1976.

== See also ==
- Asemic writing
- Bastarda
- Blackletter
- Book hand
- Calligraphy
- Chancery hand
- Court hand (also known as common law hand, Anglicana, cursiva antiquior, or charter hand)
- Cursive
- Hand (writing style)
- Handwriting
- History of writing
- Law hand
- Palaeography
- Penmanship
- Ronde script (calligraphy)
- Rotunda (script)
- Round hand
- Secretary hand
