= Chancery hand =

Two styles of historic handwriting

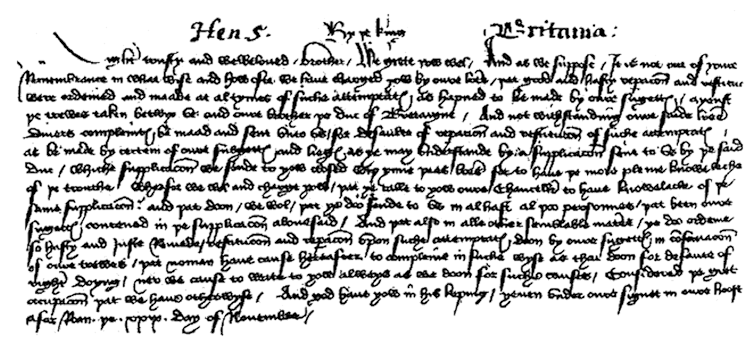
English chancery hand. Facsimile letter from Henry V of England, 1418.

The term "chancery hand" can refer to either of two distinct styles of historical handwriting.

A chancery hand was at first a form of handwriting for business transactions that developed in the Lateran chancery (the Cancelleria Apostolica) of the 13th century, then spread to France, notably through the Avignon Papacy, and to England after 1350. This early "chancery hand" is a form of blackletter. Versions of it were adopted by royal and ducal chanceries, which were often staffed by clerics who had taken minor orders.

A later cursive "chancery hand", also developed in the Vatican but based on humanist minuscule (itself based on Carolingian minuscule), was introduced in the 1420s by Niccolò Niccoli; it was the manuscript origin of the typefaces we recognize as italic.

== Blackletter chancery ==
=== English chancery hand ===
In medieval England each of the royal departments tended to develop its own characteristic hand: the chancery hand used in the royal chancery at Westminster from the mid-century was employed for writs, enrolments, patents, and engrossing of royal letters; its use continued for the enrollment of acts of Parliament until 1836.

The English chancery hand was already an arcane speciality by the time of the Restoration. Samuel Pepys recorded (Thursday 12 July 1660):

Up early and by coach to White Hall with Commissioner Pett, where, after we had talked with my Lord, I went to the Privy Seal and got my bill perfected there, and at the Signet: and then to the House of Lords, and met with Mr. Kipps, who directed me to Mr. Beale to get my patent engrossed; but he not having time to get it done in Chancery-hand, I was forced to run all up and down Chancery-lane, and the Six Clerks' Office but could find none that could write the hand, that were at leisure.

== Cursive chancery hand ==
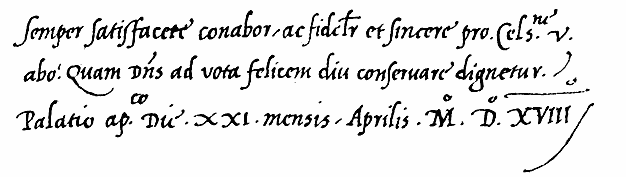
Chancery cursive (cancelleresca corsiva) hand. Papal Letter to Christian II of Denmark, 21 April 1518 (Royal Archives)

The later cancelleresca corsiva ("cursive chancery hand"), often called "Chancery Cursive", developed from Humanist minuscule, itself the progeny of Carolingian minuscule, in the mid-15th century as "a cursive form of the humanistic minuscule". In England and France at the time it was known as Italic. In English it is often changed in spelling to cancellaresca corsiva. The Italian scribe Ludovico Vicentino degli Arrighi's 1522 influential pamphlet on handwriting called La Operina was the first book on writing the italic script known as cursive chancery hand. He was a scribe in the Papal Curia, which had refined cursive chancery hand in its infancy during the latter half of the 15th century. While considered a cursive, this "papal hand" was "strongly disciplined in form, regular in movement and slightly, if at all, inclined from the perpendicular."

In cursive chancery hand the pen was held slanted at a 45° angle for speed, but it could also produce beautiful calligraphic writing. In 15th-century Italy the cursive chancery hand was employed in correspondence, everyday business, and documents of minor formal importance.

It was adapted as the model for the italic typeface developed by Aldus Manutius in Venice, from punches cut by Francesco Griffo and first used in 1500 for the small portable series of inexpensive classics that issued from the Aldine press.

In 16th-century England it became known as the "Italian hand" to distinguish it from the angular, cramped, Blackletter-derived English chancery hand which had been developed earlier and independently.

== See also ==
- Asemic writing – Wordless open semantic form of writing
- Bastarda – Various scripts and typefaces of Renaissance Europe
- Blackletter – Historic European script and typeface
- Book hand – Legible handwriting style
- Calligraphy – Visual art related to writing
- Court hand – Gothic scripts in medieval English law courts (also known as law hand, Anglicana, cursiva antiquior, or charter hand)
- Cursive – Style of penmanship
- Hand (writing style) – Style of handwriting
- Handwriting – Writing created by a person with a writing implement
- History of writing
- Italic script – Style of handwriting and calligraphy developed in Italy
- Palaeography – Study of handwriting and manuscripts
- Penmanship – Technique of writing with the hand
- Ronde script (calligraphy) – Sixteenth-century handwriting script
- Rotunda (script) – Medieval blackletter script
- Round hand – Type of handwriting, unified with chancery hand in Unicode (but with different variation sequences)
- Secretary hand – Style of European handwriting
- Zapfino – a digital typeface that simulates an italic chancery hand, designed by Hermann Zapf
