= Handwriting style =

- Handwriting, a personal and unique style of writing
- Handwriting script (hand), a formal, impersonal, generic style of handwriting.
- Script typeface, a typeface that imitates handwriting or calligraphy.
