= Library script =

Library script may refer to:

- A software library written in a scripting language
- Library hand, a handwriting style
