= Court hand =

Handwriting style in medieval English law courts

Court hand Business hand, departmental hand, documentary hand, Anglicana
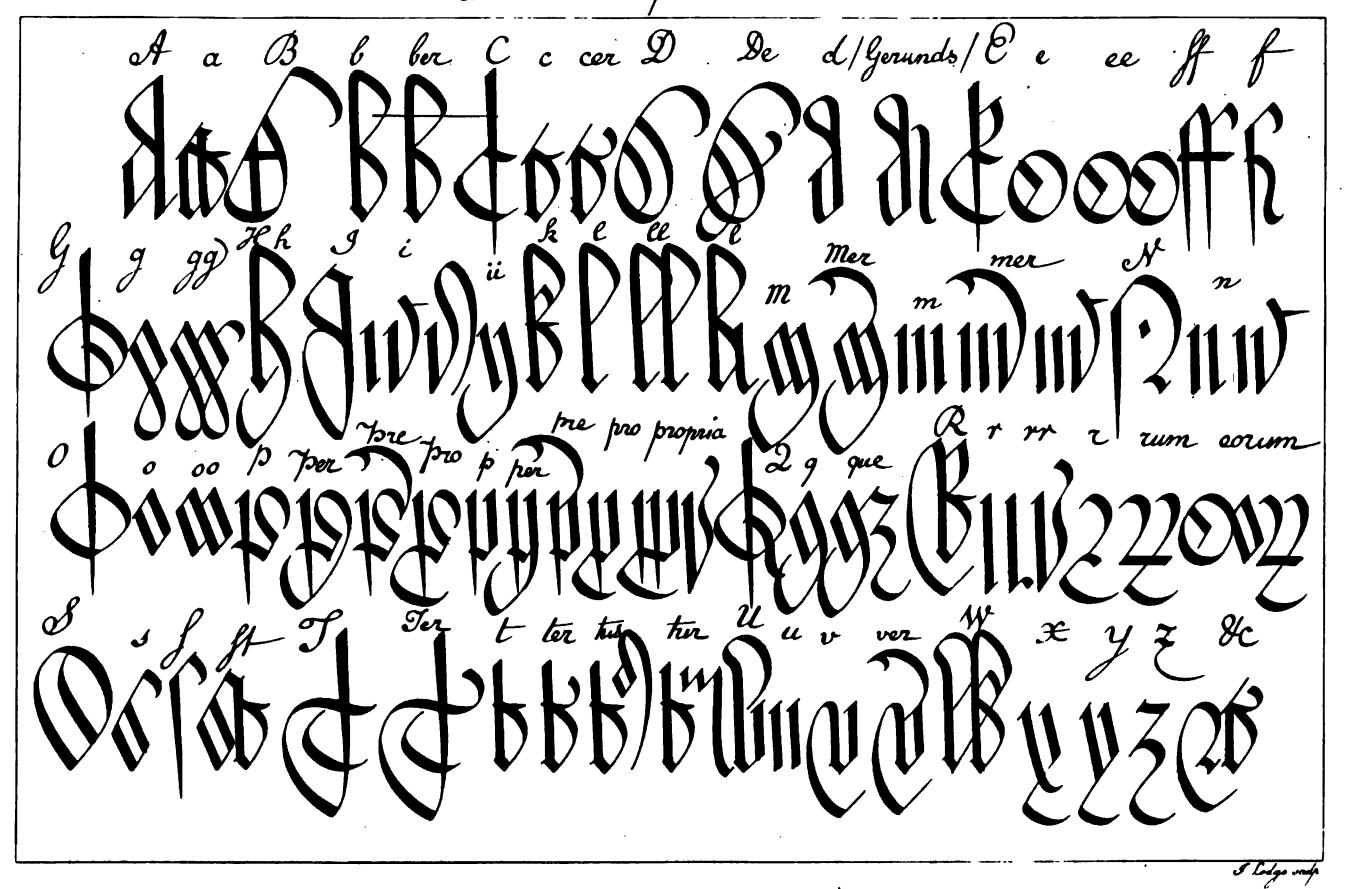
- An abecedarium of Court Hand, including minuscule and majuscule letters, ligatures, and Latin scribal abbreviations
- Script type: Alphabet
- Period: 12th century (last quarter) – 18th century
- Region: Western Europe
- Languages: Latin, English, Norman French

Related scripts
- Parent systems: Gothic: Protogothic semicursive; Court hand
- Child systems: Cursiva Anglicana, Secretary hand

Court hand, also known as business, departmental, documentary or charter hands, or Anglicana were any of a number of Gothic scripts used in medieval English law courts and later by professionals such as lawyers and clerks for record keeping. This was in contrast to book hands which were scripts used for library or liturgical manuscripts.

The script was in use throughout most of Europe from the late 12th to 17th (or even 18th in certain contexts) centuries and includes scripts such as Cursiva Anglicana, Mongrel Hand, Splayed Hand, Secretary Hand and through the latter's combination with Humanistic Hand, Mixed hand, which in turn gave rise to English Round Hand. Variants of Chancery Hand continued to be used into the 18th century until 1731.

== Definition ==
Court hand is not a single script but rather a use case to which several of the Gothic system of scripts can be applied. Reference books often do not list scripts under court hand but rather its specific scripts as this is more useful for paleographers.

Early business hands, the fluent practical sisters of strait-laced book hand, were developed for the ordinary business of the clerk in government, the church or commerce. The busiest clerks were, perhaps, those working in the departments and courts of government. Here were written the official administrative records (properly termed archives) which enshrine the indispensable collective memory of government. The various scripts of government clerks are referred to as departmental or court hands, because a number of the oldest departments of government organised their business on the lines of a court of justice.

- Barrett & Iredale, 1995

Court hand refers specifically to the cursive scripts developed from the Protogothic in use for medieval court records, but also became used for charters and other documents. It is not a clearly defined term and is often used as a general term to refer to the scripts of business records before Secretary Hand; however because Secretary was also used for business, it is often considered a court hand as well.

To the Gothic cursives used from the thirteenth century and which were well developed and established in England by the mid-fourteenth century, the name anglicana often applied by palaeographers in the mid-twentieth century because of their distinctive English character.

== History ==
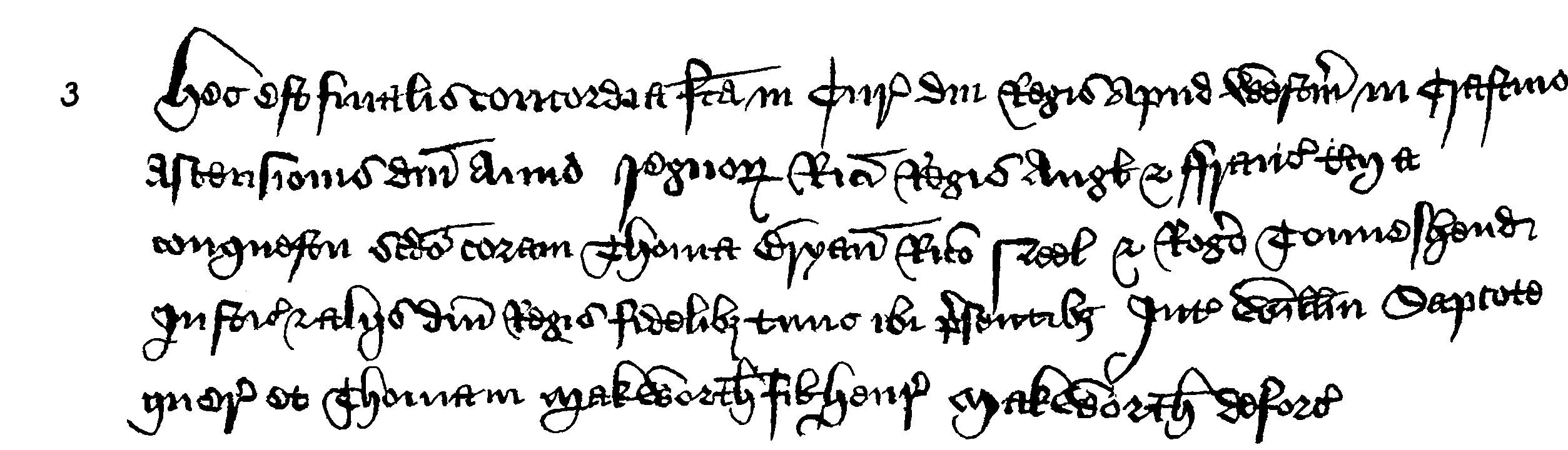
Example of a court hand (Cursiva Anglicana) from a final concord of the court of common pleas, 1485. The first line reads: "Haec est finalis concordia facta in curia domini Regis apud Westmonasterium in Crastino"

The hand took its name from the fact that it was particularly associated with formal records of the courts of Common Pleas and King's (or Queen's) Bench, although its use was not confined to them. In the 17th and 18th centuries the writing became increasingly stylised, to the point that it was virtually illegible to any reader unfamiliar with its conventions. The hand was banned from English law courts in 1731 by the Proceedings in Courts of Justice Act 1730, which required that, with effect from 25 March 1733, court proceedings "shall be written in such a common legible Hand and Character, as the Acts of Parliament are usually ingrossed in ... and not in any Hand commonly called Court Hand, and in Words at Length and not abbreviated". (Note: The 1731 Act did not apply to Welsh courts, but this omission was rectified shortly afterwards by the Courts in Wales and Chester Act 1732 (6 Geo. 2. c.14)) (The reference to engrossing of Acts of Parliament make it clear that English chancery hand was intended.) Even in the 19th century, however, an ability to read court hand was considered useful for anyone who had to deal with old court records.

== Letter forms ==
Court hands refer to any of a number of scripts descended from Protogothic Semicursive over a period of some 500 years from the 12th to 18th centuries in use in English royal courts or law courts for record keeping.

"It is noticeably upright and packed together with exaggeratedly long ascenders and descenders, the latter often and the former occasionally brought round in sweeping crescent shaped curves".

=== Abecedarium of Scripts ===
The table lists the characteristic letter forms of court hands throughout the 13th to 16th centuries.

Abecedarium of Court Hands after Wright & Martin (1879)
Majuscule	Forms	Minuscule	Forms
A		a	
B		b	
C		c	
D		d	
E		e	
F		f	
G		g	
H		h	
I		i	
J		j	
K		k	
L		l & ll	
M		m	
N		n	
O		o & oo	
P		p & pp	
Q		q	
R		r	
S		s & st	
T		t & tt	
U		u	
V		v	
W		w	
X		x	
Y		y	
Z & etc.		z	
Et			

In the early documents there were also the following Old English letters:

- ð - after the XII century is found almost exclusively in copies of earlier documents; in its inscription coincided with the sign of the abbreviation đđ;
- þ - used until the XVI century, by which time it coincided in writing with y;
- ƿ - like ð, after the XII century almost not found; in the 15th century, copiers were often confused with þ and yy;
- ᵹ/ȝ - used from the XII to the 15th century; in the XIV-XV centuries became indistinguishable from zz;

=== Ligatures ===
Image	Transcription	Notes
	ﬀ	Replaced the initial F after the end of the XIII century
	ﬆ	

=== Abbreviations ===
Image	Symbol	Meaning	Notes
Special signs
	◌̄	m, n	It can also indicate -er and many other omissions
	ʳ	-er	Also -re, -ir, -or and other omissions; in combination with high letters is often replaced by a simple line
	ꝯ	-us	Sometimes -os
	ꝯ	con-	It looks identical to the previous one and differs only in size and location
	◌ᷣ	-ur	Sometimes -tur
	;, ꝫ	-et	Also -ue and -us; can denote the passage of other letters before -et
	🙲, &	et	Not found in the middle of words after 1200
	⁊, :t	et	Replaced the previous form everywhere except at the beginning of the word
	÷	est	After the 12th century, it is rare
	ꝭ	-es, -is	Could denote omissions, but later its meaning became more specific
Contractions
	ħ	hec	
	ḣ	hoc	
	h^{9}	hujus	
	p̄	pre	Later was replaced ꝕ
	ꝑ	per	
	ꝓ	pro	
	p^{9}	post	
	q̄	que	
	ꝗ̄	quem	
	ꝗ^{a}	quam	
	ꝗ	quod	
	ꝗ^{i}	quid	
	qꝫ	que	
	qꝛ	quia	
	ꝝ	-rum	Also denotes omission
	ẝ	ser-	Also denotes a omission; it can be recorded as sꝫ
	vꝫ	verch	In Welsh names

=== Omissions ===
Image	Symbol	Importance	Notes
	đ		
	Đ	De	
	Ẽ		
	ﬀ		
	g̃		
	ꝃ		
	ỻ	ll	
	m̃		
	ñ		
	NT		
	ⓠ	que	
	r̃		
	ꝶ		
	s̃		
	ⓣ		
	T̃		
	x̃		

=== Evolution of Scripts ===
Date	Historic Form	Transcription
1133		Anno ab incarnatione Domini 1133 facta est haec
1152	framless	Anno ab incarnatione Domini 1152, Wibertus Supprior Ecclesice Christi Cantuariensis
1176	framless	Anno ab incarnatione Domini 1152, Wibertus Supprior Ecclesice Christi Cantuariensis
1199	framless	Haec est finalis concordia facta in curia Domini Regis apud Notingham Sabbato proximo post exaltacionem Sanctae Crucis anno decimo regni Regis Ricardi.
1203	framless	Haec est finalis concordia facta in curia Domini Regis apud Notingham die Dominica proxima post festum Sancti Botulfi anno regni Regis Johannis quarto coram Domino Johanne Norwicensi Episcopo, Hugone Bardolf
1221	framless	Datum Londonii die Sancti Lucre Evangelistae pontificatus nostri anno quinto
1254	framless	Anno Domini 1254, in crastino Sancti Albini frater Hugo humilis abbas de Tironnello.
1272	framless	Vicesimo secundo die Octobris anno regni Regis Henrici filii Regis Johannis quinquagesimo sexto convenit.
1296	framless	Memorandum quod die Lunae proxima post festum purificationis bcafce Marine Virginis Anni Gratise 1296, Willielmus de Ferrariis nlius et beres Domini Willielmi de Ferrariis.
1305	framless	Memorandum quod die sabbati proximo ante festum Sancti Laurentii anno regni Regis Edwardi filii Regis Henrici trieesinio tertio. Ita.
1309	framless	Anno regni Regis Edwardi filii Regis Edwardi secundo inter Robertum de
1311	framless	In Dei nomine Amen. Anno ejusdem millesimo tricentesimo undecimo indictione nona.
1331	framless	Datum apud Shirborne die dominiea proxirna ante festum Sancti Valentini, anno regni Regis Edwardi tertii post conquestum quarto.
1386	framless	Haec indentura facta apud Lewestone in bundredo de Shirborne die Lunco proxima post festum Sancti Matboei Apostoli anno regni Regis Ricardi secundi nono
1407	framless	Data apud Lewston' predictam die Jovis proxima ante festum Sancti Jacobi Apostoli anno regni Regis Henrici quarti post conquestum octavo
1413	framless	Data apud Sparham die Jovis proxima ante festuni Sancti Matthaei Apostoli, anno regni Regis Henrici Quinti post Conquoestum primo.
1437	framless	In Witnesse to this present letteris I have putte to my seal the 13th day of June, the yere of the regne of Kyng Henry the Sixte after the Conquest, 15 yeris.
1475	framless	In the yere of oure lorde Kynge Edwarde the IIIIthe after the Conqueste of Ingelonde 13the.
1500	framless	Data apud Leweston 14 die mensis Decembris, anno regni Regis Henrici Septimi quintodecimo.
1529	framless	This Indenture made the 12th daye of June, the 20th yere of the Raygne of Kynge Harry the 8th.
1549	framless	Yoven at Sparhani the 16th day of the Moneth of Octobre, in the seconde yere of the reigne of Edward the Syxt.
1549	framless	Thys indenture made the tenthe day of Januarie, in the seconde and thyrde yere of the reygne of oure Sovereygne Lord and Lady Phyllyp and Marye.
1588	framless	Three and thirteth yere of the reigne of our Soveraigne Ladie Elizabeth.

== Cultural references ==
- In Shakespeare's Henry VI, Part 2 (written c.1591), Act 4, scene 2, Dick the Butcher says of Emmanuel, Clerk of Chatham, "He can make Obligations, and write court-hand."
- Court hand is referred to in T. H. White's novel The Sword in the Stone (1938).

== See also ==
- Bastarda – Various scripts and typefaces of Renaissance Europe
- Blackletter – Historic European script and typeface
- Book hand – Stylised medieval handwriting style
- Calligraphy – Writing as a visual art
- Chancery hand – Two styles of historic handwriting
- Cursive – Style of penmanship
- Handwriting – Writing created by a person with a writing implement
- History of writing
- Italic script – Style of handwriting and calligraphy developed in Italy
- Palaeography – Study of handwriting and manuscripts
- Penmanship – Technique of writing with the hand
- Ronde script (calligraphy) – Sixteenth-century French script
- Rotunda (script) – Medieval blackletter script
- Round hand – Type of handwriting
- Secretary hand – Style of European handwriting

== General and cited references ==
- Barrett, John; Iredale, David (1995). Discovering Old Handwriting. Princes Risborough: Shire Publications. ISBN 0-7478-0268-8.
- Hector, L.C. (1966). The Handwriting of English Documents (2nd ed.). London: Edward Arnold.
- Johnson, Charles; Jenkinson, Hilary (1915). English Court Hand A.D. 1066 to 1500: Illustrated Chiefly from the Public Records. Oxford: Clarendon Press.
- Wright, Andrew; Martin, Charles Trice (1879). Court-Hand Restored or, The Student's Assistant in Reading Old Deeds, Charters, Records, Etc (9th ed.). London: Reeves & Turner.
