= Library hand =

Rounded style of handwriting formerly taught in library schools

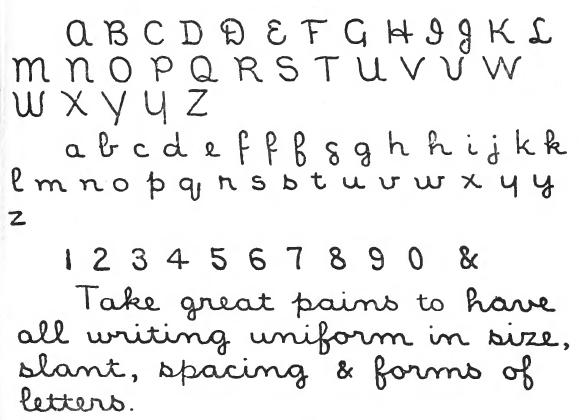
'Joined hand' from John Cotton Dana's A Library Primer (Chicago: Library Bureau, 1899), page 71

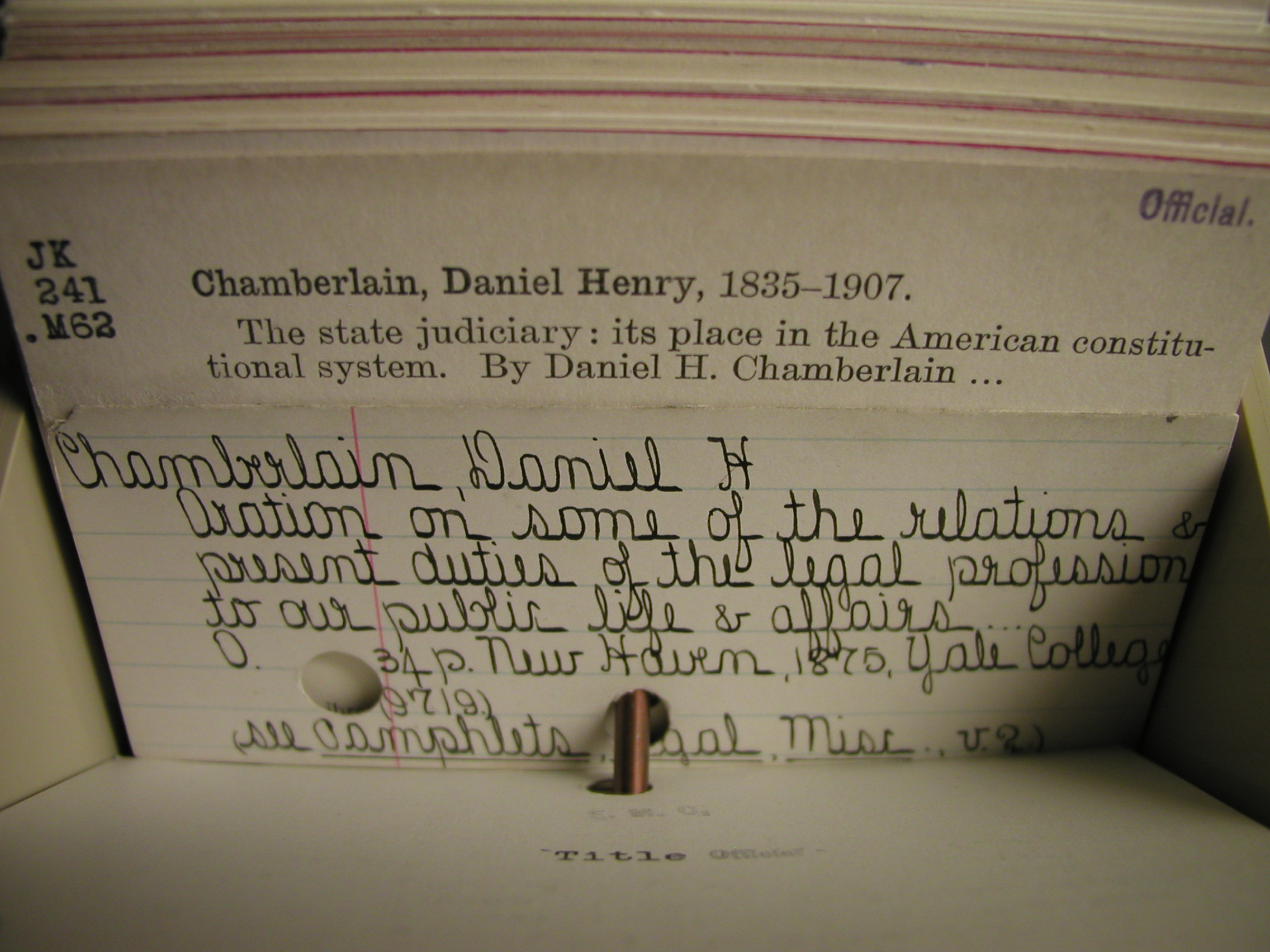
The first card written west of Cambridge in library hand

Library hand is a rounded style of handwriting once taught in library schools. The intention was to ensure uniformity and legibility in the handwritten cards of library catalogs. Beginning in September 1885, Melvil Dewey and Thomas Edison developed and perfected the approved library hand to be taught in library school and used in libraries. The penmanship was based on Edison's own handwriting in which he stated that "I had perfected a style of handwriting which would allow me to take legibly from the wire, long hand, forty-seven and even fifty-four words a minute".

The 1903 Handbook of the New York State Library School listed the requirements of library hand. They included legibility, speed, and uniformity. The particular type of ink, inkstands, pens, penholders, and erasers was specified. The standards for lettering were dictated in regard to size, slant, spacing, special letters and figures, and even the proper posture and position of the writer was outlined.

The teaching of library hand declined after the widespread introduction of the typewriter in the early 20th century.
