= Bastarda =

Various scripts and typefaces of Renaissance Europe

Bastarda or bastard is a term applied to a variety of scripts and typefaces originating in western Europe during the Renaissance. They were often used as business or court hands.

== Scripts ==
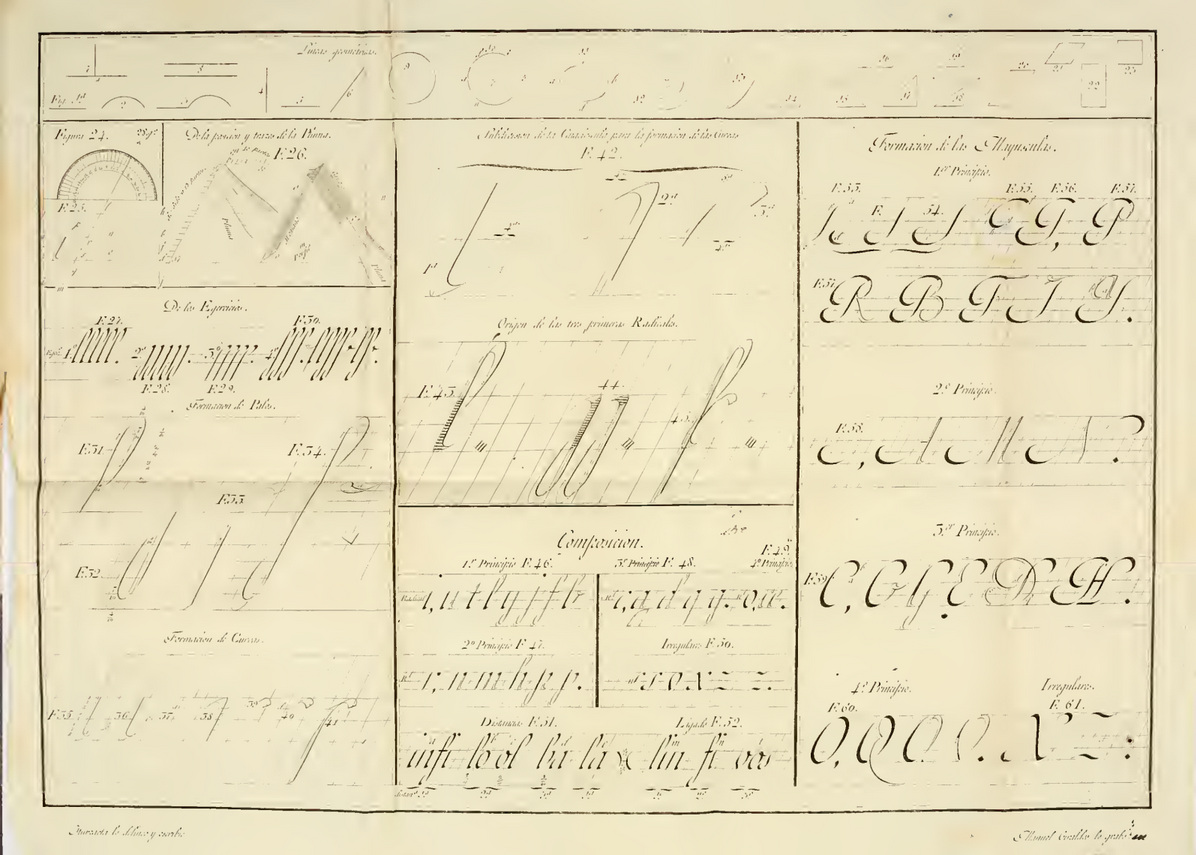
Handwriting model in de Iturzaeta's Arte de escribir letra bastarda español

Bastard gothic scripts were blackletter manuscript hands used in various parts of continental Europe, especially France, the Netherlands, and Germany, during the 14th and 15th centuries. They were primarily used to write vernacular narratives, business documents, and other informal matter. Some varieties were semi-cursive, while others resembled more formal blackletter styles. Similar English scripts are sometimes distinguished as "bastarda Anglicana".

The French bâtarde italienne was developed in the 17th century by writing master Louis Barbedor, combining aspects of the French ronde script with the Italian hand. It was published in the influential 1647 manual Les ecritures, financières et italien-bastarde which helped to establish the French ronde script.

Spanish bastarda was a modified form of Italic script which remained in use until as late as the 1830s. The paleographer A. S. Osley characterized this bastarda as the "true successor" of the Italic hand, which had been supplanted by an early form of copperplate script outside Spain.

== Type ==
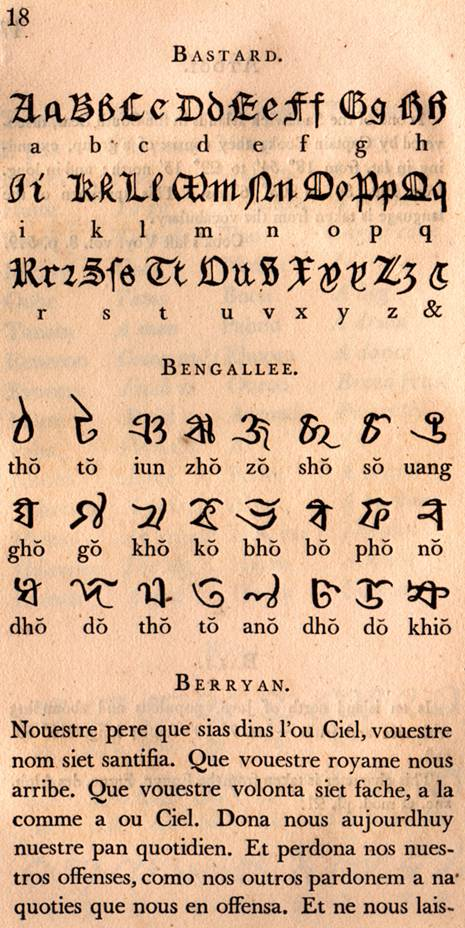
Bastarda type in Fry's Pantographia

Early printers produced a variety of typefaces based on local gothic bastarda styles.

Over time, most of Europe's printers standardized on Antiqua (or "roman") typefaces, and bastarda type fell out of use in most countries. Despite this trend, the German variety developed into the national Fraktur type, which remained in use until the mid-twentieth century.

British typeface designer Jonathan Barnbrook has designed a contemporary interpretation of these early typefaces titled Bastard.

== See also ==
- Chancery hand
- Court hand (also known as common law hand, Anglicana, cursiva antiquior, or charter hand)
- Italic script
- Antiqua–Fraktur dispute
