= Italian hand =

Renaissance-era calligraphic script

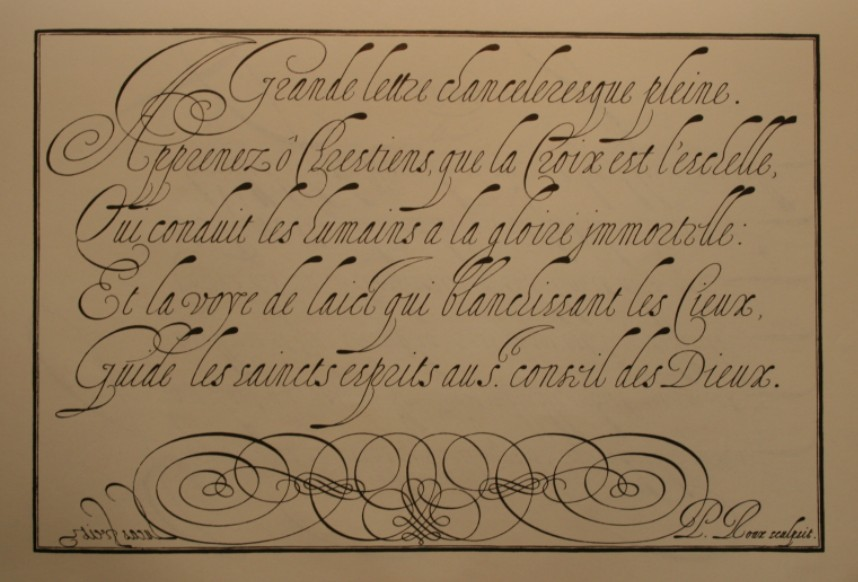
Example of French Italian hand by Lucas Materot, 1608

Alphabet of letter combinations used in Italian hand by Lucas Materot, 1608

Italian hand is a calligraphic script originating from Italy in the late 16th century. It is characterized by its highly fluid, ovular letterforms, fine sloping lines, and complex flourishes. It was in popular use from the 17th to the early 18th century.

The script was written using a finely cut quill pen with a long slit for greater flexibility. The pen was held only by the thumb and forefinger for freer mobility while executing the script.
