= Johann Bämler =

German printer (1430–1503)

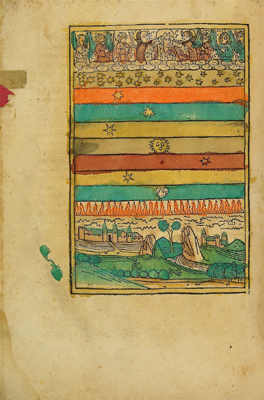
The third illustrated edition of Konrad von Megenberg's Buch der Natur (1481), one of the most famous incunabula printed by Johann Bämler

Johann Bämler (sometimes Johannes Bämler, Johann Baemler or Hans Bemler, 1430–1503) was a printer, illuminator and bookseller from Augsburg, Germany.

Bämler is mentioned in Augsburgian city records from 1453 as a scribe and from 1477 as a printer. He appears to have begun his career as an illuminator and calligrapher; a few illuminated manuscript pages and books decorated by calligraphy by his hand survive to this day (in the Free Library of Philadelphia, Bavarian State Library, Herzog August Library, Morgan Library & Museum and others).

He probably learnt the art of print-making in the shop of Günther Zainer. The first printed book by Bämler appeared in April 1472, and the first illustrated printed book from his workshop in September 1473. He based his typefaces on local cursive script, and they are considered to have contributed to the development of the Schwabacher. Approximately half of the books printed in his printing office were illustrated with woodcuts or other decorative elements.

He belonged to the guild of painters, glassmakers, woodcut-makers and goldbeaters, and eventually reached a high position within the guild. His printing activity ceased in 1495.
