= Handwriting script =

Style of handwriting

The evolution of the Latin alphabet through various scripts.

A script or handwriting script is a formal, standard style of handwriting (as opposed to personal handwriting) within a writing system. A hand may be a synonym or a variation, such as a subset of script.

There is a variety of historical styles in manuscript documents, Some of them belonging to calligraphy, whereas some were set up for better readability, utility or teaching (teaching script).

Historic styles of handwriting may be studied by palaeography.

== List of scripts ==
- Chancery hand
- Round hand
- Secretary hand
- Court hand
- Library hand
- Blackletter
- Italian hand
- Italic script
- Ronde
- Humanist minuscule
- Carolingian minuscule
- Roman cursive
- Uncial script
- Insular script
- Beneventan script
- Visigothic script
- Merovingian script

== Sources ==
- Florey, K.B. (2013). Script and Scribble: The Rise and Fall of Handwriting. Melville House. ISBN 978-1-61219-305-2.
- Douglas, A. (2017). Work in Hand: Script, Print, and Writing, 1690-1840. Oxford Textual Perspectives. OUP Oxford. ISBN 978-0-19-250621-4.
- Thornton, T.P. (1996). Handwriting in America: A Cultural History. Yale University Press. ISBN 978-0-300-07441-3.
