= Book hand =

Stylised medieval handwriting style

Book hand or text hand is a classification handwriting scripts used during ancient and medieval times. Book hands were intended for regularity and legibility and were often used in transcribing official documents prior to the development of printing and similar technologies.

== See also ==
- Block letters
- Court hand
- Blackletter
- History of writing
- Secretary hand
