= Carolingian minuscule =

Form of writing

- Carolingian minuscule alphabet.
- Direction: Left to right

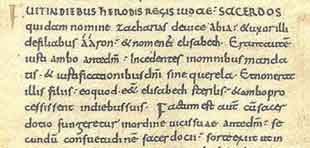
Example from 10th-century manuscript, Vulgate Luke 1:5–8.

Carolingian minuscule or Caroline minuscule is a script which developed as a calligraphic standard in the medieval European period as part of an overall effort to create a clear, uniform, and consistent manner by which to copy books. Multiple abbeys had begun to experiment with improvements to earlier Merovingian cursive scripts, with one version of an early Caroline script being developed at the scriptorium of the Benedictine monks of Corbie Abbey, about 150 kilometres (95 miles) north of Paris. The development and adoption of an improved minuscule script was slow and occurred across many locations throughout the Carolingian empire, although a later version of Caroline minuscule developed at the scriptoria of Tours and used in the creation of widely distributed bibles and Gospel books helped to contribute to an overall Caroline minuscule standard. Further adoption was encouraged by the issuance of imperial capitularies, with the script continuing to spread throughout the Holy Roman Empire and beyond, ultimately replacing Insular script in Britain and Ireland in the eleventh and twelfth centuries as well as Visigothic script in the Iberian peninsula.

Carolingian minuscule subsequently evolved in the tenth and eleventh centuries into a script which became known as blackletter or Gothic script, with the Carolingian minuscule becoming increasingly obsolete until the fourteenth century and the Italian Renaissance, when a script modeled on it and known as humanist minuscule script was developed. Through this later script the Carolingian minuscule can be seen as a direct ancestor of most modern-day Latin letter scripts and typefaces such as Times New Roman.

== Creation ==
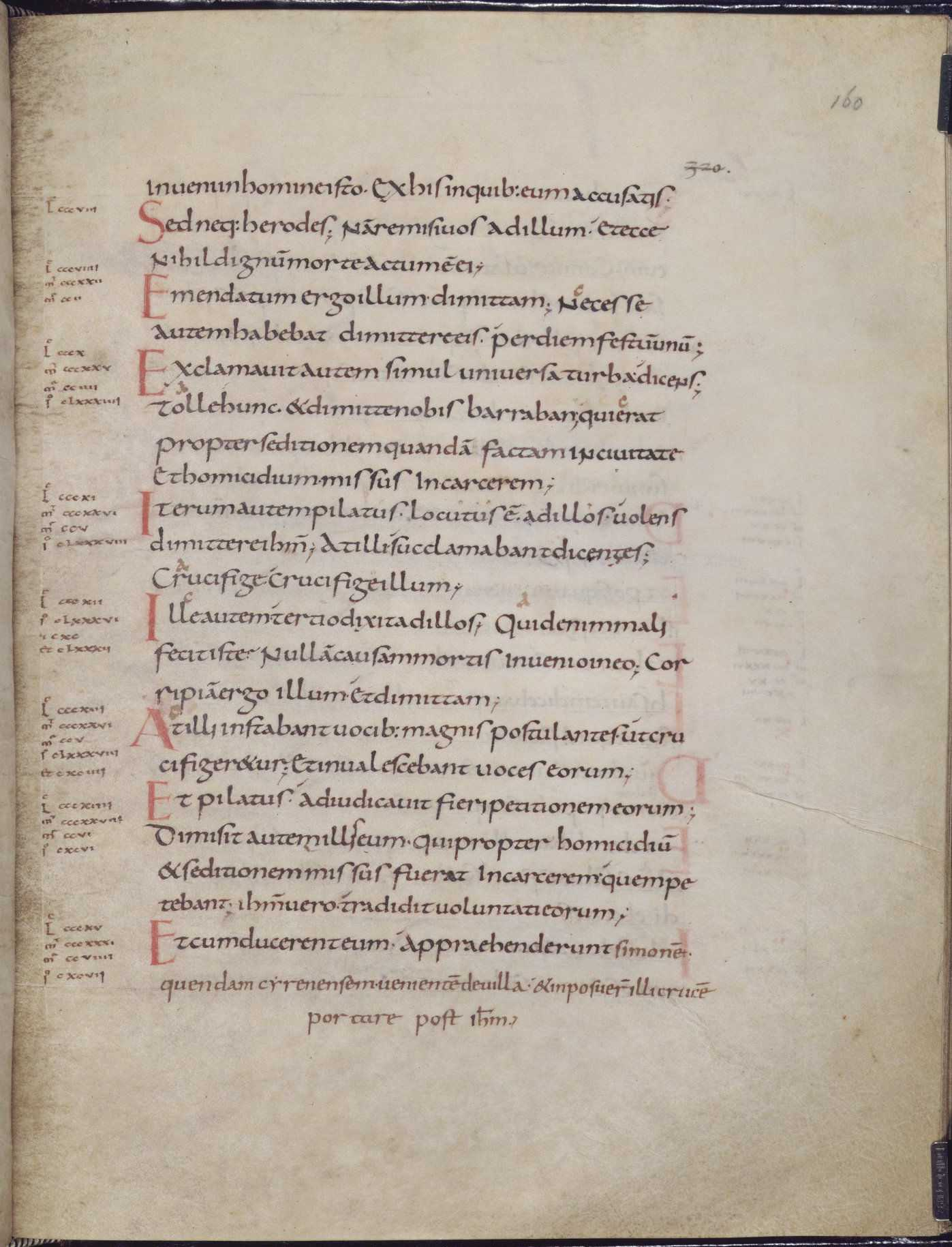
Page of text (folio 160v) from a Carolingian Gospel Book (British Library, Add MS 11848), written in Carolingian minuscule. Text is Vulgate Luke 23:15–26.

Caroline minuscule is derived from various other scripts, all of which ultimately descend from late Roman cursive and Uncial scripts. Its derivation can be seen as progressing in two phases: an initial phase in which scriptoria, somewhat in response to Charlemagne's ecclesiastical and legal reforms, individually worked to develop and improve the script used in copying documents; and a second phase in which the individual scripts began to lose any distinctive characteristics and style, and instead adopt and conform to a more uniform style. The way in which individual scriptoria improved their techniques generally followed a similar pattern, however: initially beginning with improvements to an existing Merovingian script, they would next incorporate features associated with Insular scripts from British and Irish monasteries, all the while in parallel adopting Half-uncial characteristics for economy in speed of copying and use of parchment.

Carolingian minuscule was created partly under the patronage of the Emperor Charlemagne (hence Carolingian). Charlemagne had a keen interest in learning, according to his biographer Einhard (here with apices):

Temptábat et scríbere, tabulásque et códicellós ad hoc in lectó sub cervícálibus circumferre solébat, ut, cum vacuum tempus esset, manum litterís effigiendís adsuésceret, sed parum successit labor praeposterus ac séró incohátus.

Translation:

He also tried to write, and used to keep tablets and blanks in bed under his pillow, that at leisure hours he might accustom his hand to form the letters; however, as he did not begin his efforts in due season, but late in life, they met with ill success.

This new script was significantly more legible than the ones used in earlier periods of the Middle Ages and was also superior to the book scripts used in the Roman period, because it provided word spacing, more punctuation, and conventions such as the usage of upper-case for titles, a mix of upper and lower case for subtitles, and lower case for the body of a text. Although Charlemagne was never fully literate, he understood the value of literacy and a uniform script in running his empire. Charlemagne sent for the English scholar Alcuin of York to run his palace school and scriptorium at his capital, Aachen. Efforts to supplant Gallo-Roman and Germanic scripts had been under way before Alcuin arrived at Aachen, where he was master from 782 to 796, with a two-year break. The new minuscule was disseminated first from Aachen, of which the Ada Gospels provided classic models, and later from the influential scriptorium at Marmoutier Abbey (Tours), where Alcuin withdrew from court service as an abbot in 796 and restructured the scriptorium.

== Characteristics ==
Carolingian minuscule was uniform with rounded shapes in clearly distinguishable glyphs, disciplined and above all, legible. Clear capital letters and spaces between words became standard in Carolingian minuscule, which was one result of a campaign to achieve a culturally unifying standardization across the Carolingian Empire.

Traditional charters, however, continued to be written in a Merovingian "chancery hand" long after manuscripts of Scripture and classical literature were being produced in the minuscule hand. Documents written in a local language, like Gothic or Anglo-Saxon rather than Latin, tended to be expressed in traditional local script.

Carolingian script generally has fewer ligatures than other contemporary scripts, although the et (&), æ, rt, st, and ct ligatures are common. The letter d often appears in an uncial form with an ascender slanting to the left, but the letter g is essentially the same as the modern minuscule letter, rather than the previously common uncial ᵹ. Ascenders are usually "clubbed" – they become thicker near the top.

The early period of the script, during Charlemagne's reign in the late 8th century and early 9th, still has widely varying letter forms in different regions. The uncial form of the letter a, similar to a double c (cc), was still used in manuscripts from this period. There was also use of punctuation such as the question mark, as in Beneventan script of the same period. The script flourished during the 9th century, when regional hands developed into an international standard, with less variation of letter forms. Modern glyphs, such as s and v, began to appear (as opposed to the "long s" ſ and u), and ascenders, after thickening at the top, were finished with a three-cornered wedge. The script began to evolve slowly after the 9th century. In the 10th and 11th centuries, ligatures were rare and ascenders began to slant to the right and were finished with a fork. The letter w also began to appear. By the 12th century, Carolingian letters had become more angular and were written closer together, less legibly than in previous centuries; at the same time, the modern dotted i appeared.

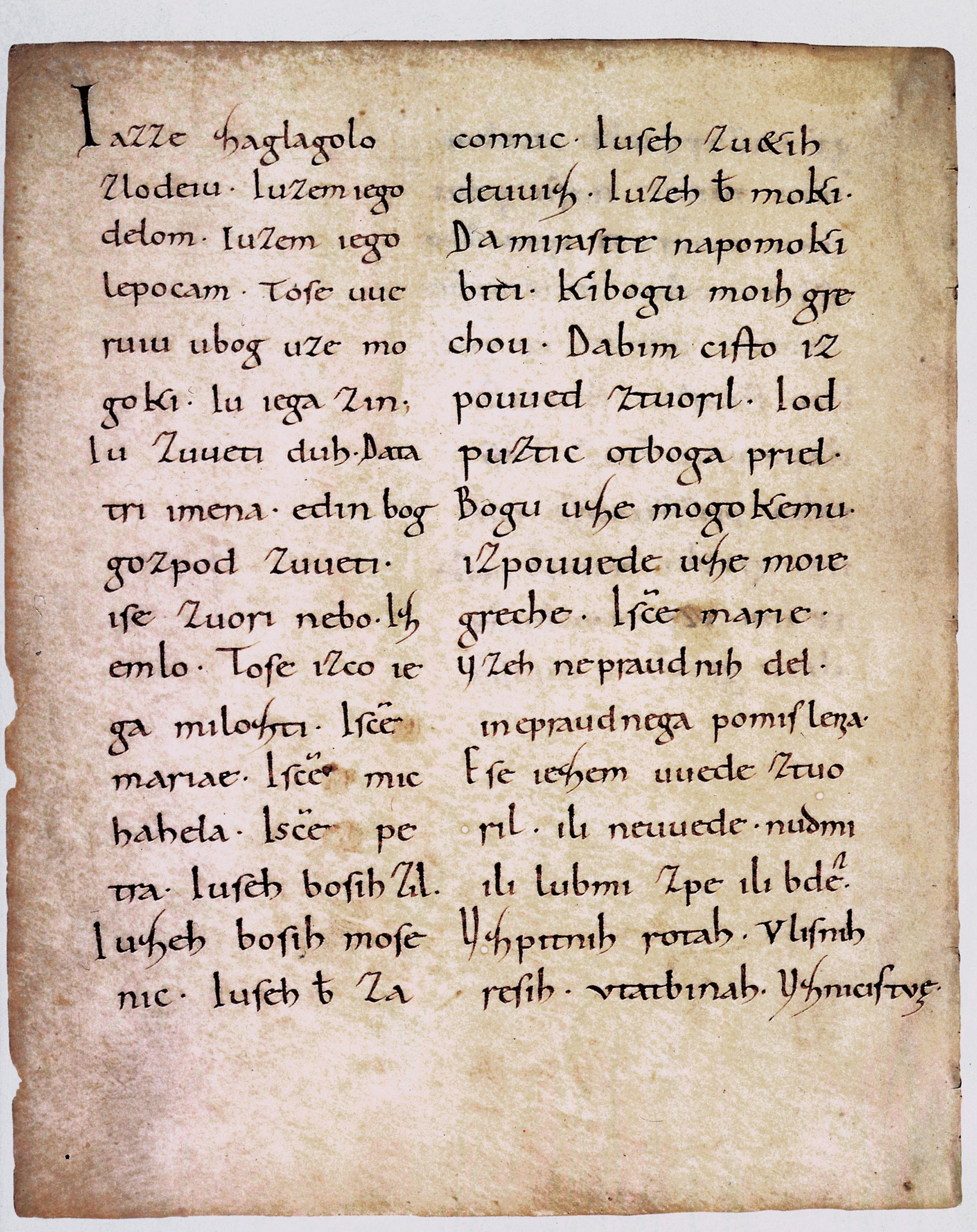
A page of the Freising manuscripts, showing 10th-century Slovene text written in Carolingian minuscule. Bavarian State Library, Munich.

== Spread ==
The new script spread through Western Europe most widely where Carolingian influence was strongest. In luxuriously produced lectionaries that now began to be produced for princely patronage of abbots and bishops, legibility was essential. It reached far afield: the 10th century Freising manuscripts, which contain the oldest Slovene language, the first Roman-script record of any Slavic language, are written in Carolingian minuscule. In Switzerland, Carolingian was used in the Rhaetian and Alemannic minuscule types. Manuscripts written in Rhaetian minuscule tend to have slender letters, resembling Insular script, with the letters ⟨a⟩ and ⟨t⟩, and ligatures such as ⟨ri⟩, showing similar to Visigothic and Beneventan. Alemannic minuscule, used for a short time in the early 9th century, is usually larger, broader, and very vertical in comparison to the slanting Rhaetian type. It was developed by the monk Wolfcoz I at the Abbey of Saint Gall. In the Holy Roman Empire, Carolingian script flourished in Salzburg, Austria, as well as in Fulda, Mainz, and Würzburg, all of which were major centers of the script. German minuscule tends to be oval-shaped, very slender, and slanted to the right. It has uncial features as well, such as the ascender of the letter ⟨d⟩ slanting to the left, and vertical initial strokes of ⟨m⟩ and ⟨n⟩.

In northern Italy, the monastery at Bobbio used Carolingian minuscule beginning in the 9th century. Outside the sphere of influence of Charlemagne and his successors, however, the new legible hand was resisted by the Roman Curia; nevertheless the Romanesca type was developed in Rome after the 10th century. The script was not taken up in England and Ireland until ecclesiastic reforms in the middle of the 10th century; in Spain a traditionalist Visigothic hand survived; and in southern Italy a 'Beneventan minuscule' survived in the lands of the Lombard duchy of Benevento through the 13th century, although Romanesca eventually also appeared in southern Italy.

== Role in cultural transmission ==
Scholars during the Carolingian Renaissance sought out and copied in the new legible standardized hand many Roman texts that had been wholly forgotten. Most of contemporary knowledge of classical literature derives from copies made in the scriptoria of Charlemagne. Over 7000 manuscripts written in Carolingian script survive from the 8th and 9th centuries alone.

Though the Carolingian minuscule was superseded by Gothic blackletter hands, in retrospect, it seemed so thoroughly 'classic' to the humanists of the early Renaissance that they took these old Carolingian manuscripts to be ancient Roman originals, and used them as bases for their Renaissance hand, the "humanist minuscule". From there the script passed to the 15th- and 16th-century printers of books, such as Aldus Manutius of Venice. In this way it forms the basis of our modern lowercase typefaces. Indeed, 'Carolingian minuscule' is a style of typeface, which approximates this historical hand, eliminating the nuances of size of capitals, long descenders, and so on.

== See also ==
- Ada Gospels
