= Secretary hand =

Style of European handwriting

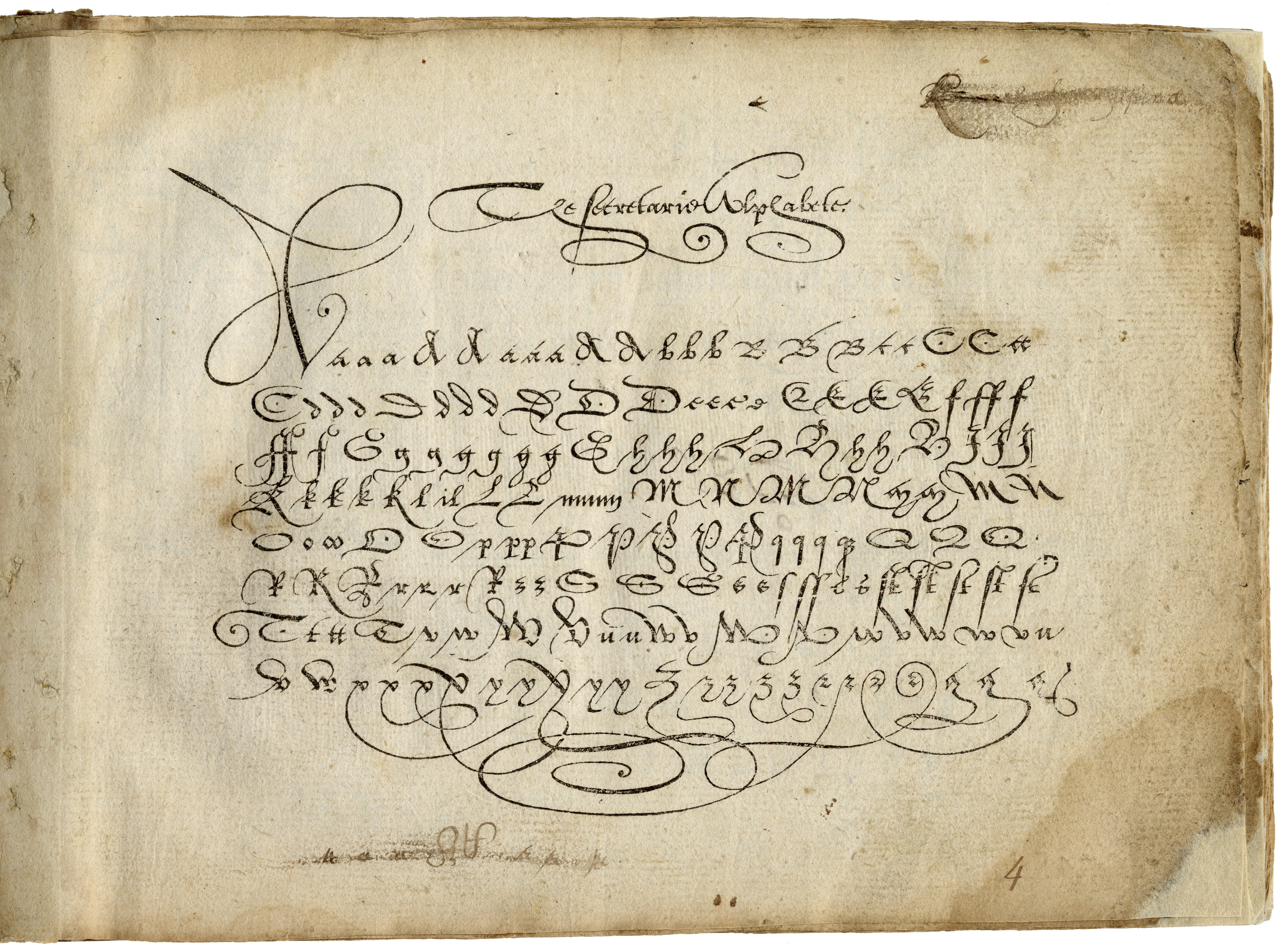
"The secretarie Alphabete": an abecedarium showing the forms of the letters used in secretary hand, from a penmanship book by Jehan de Beau-Chesne and John Baildon, 1570

Secretary hand or secretary script is a style of European handwriting developed in the early sixteenth century that remained common in the sixteenth and seventeenth centuries for writing English, German, Dutch, Welsh and Gaelic.

== History ==
Predominating before the dominance of Italic script, it arose out of the need for a hand more legible and universally recognizable than the book hand of the High Middle Ages, in order to cope with the increase in long-distance business and personal correspondence, in cities, chanceries and courts. The hand thus used by secretaries was developed from cursive business hands and was in common use throughout the British Isles through the seventeenth century. In spite of its loops and flourishes it was widely used by scriveners and others whose daily employment comprised hours of writing. By 1618 the writing-master Martin Billingsley in his The Pen's Excellency, 1618, distinguished three forms of secretary hand, as well as "mixed" hands that employed some Roman letterforms, and the specialised hands, the court hand used only in the courts of the King's Bench and Common Pleas and the archaic hands used for engrossing pipe rolls and other documents.

At the time of Henry VII, many writers began to use the "Italian" style instead, a cursive script developed from the humanist minuscule or "Roman" hand which was easier to read but also easier to forge. English ladies were often taught an "Italian hand", suitable for the occasional writing that they were expected to do. Grace Ioppolo notes that the convention in writing the texts of dramas was to write act and scene settings, characters' names and stage directions in italic, and the dialogue in secretary hand. The modern use of italic font stems from these distinctions.

Aside from palaeographers themselves, genealogists, social historians and scholars of Early Modern literature have become accustomed to reading secretary hand.

Notable examples of secretary hand in use
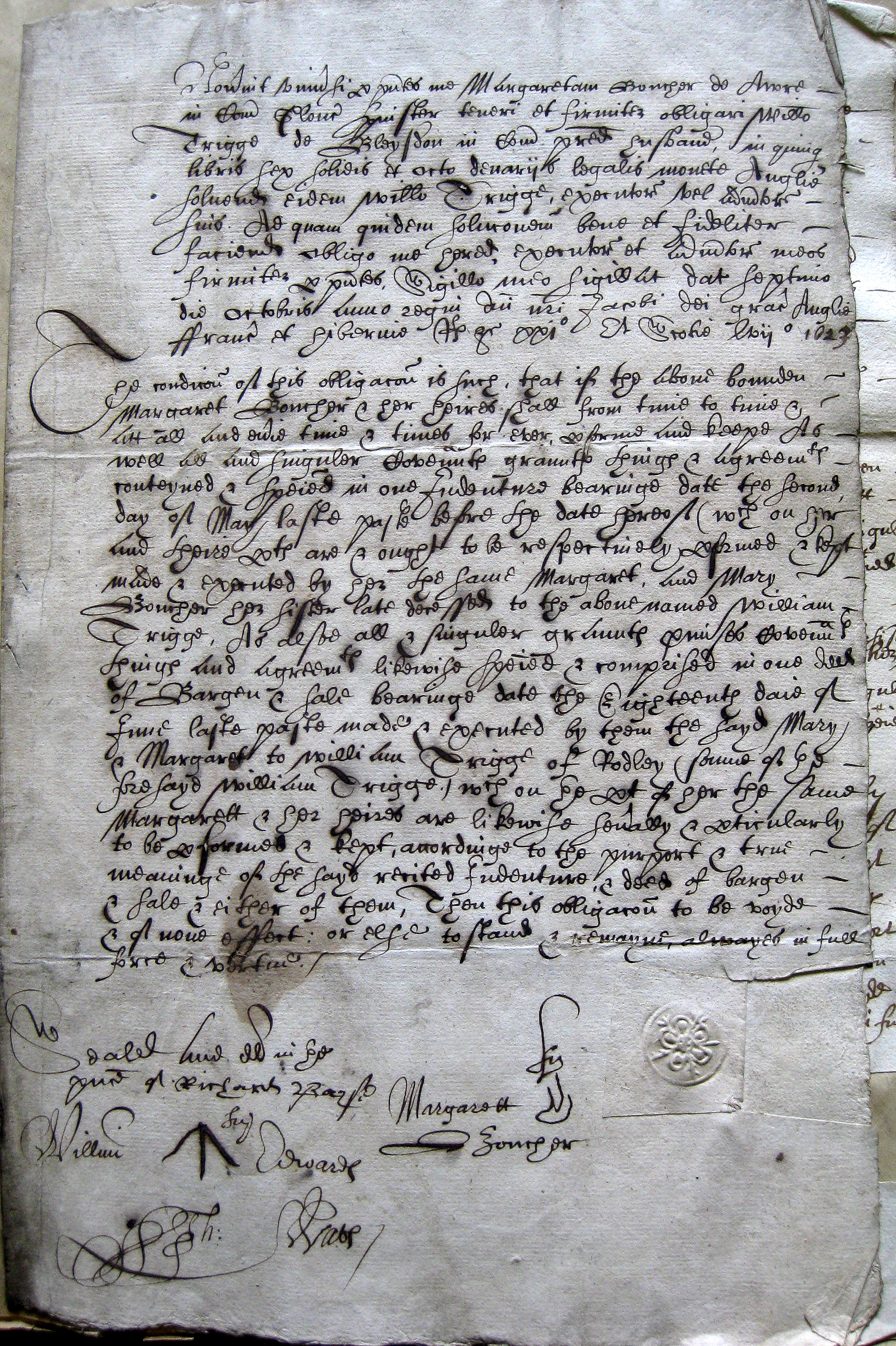
Covenant bond from 1623 written in Latin and English

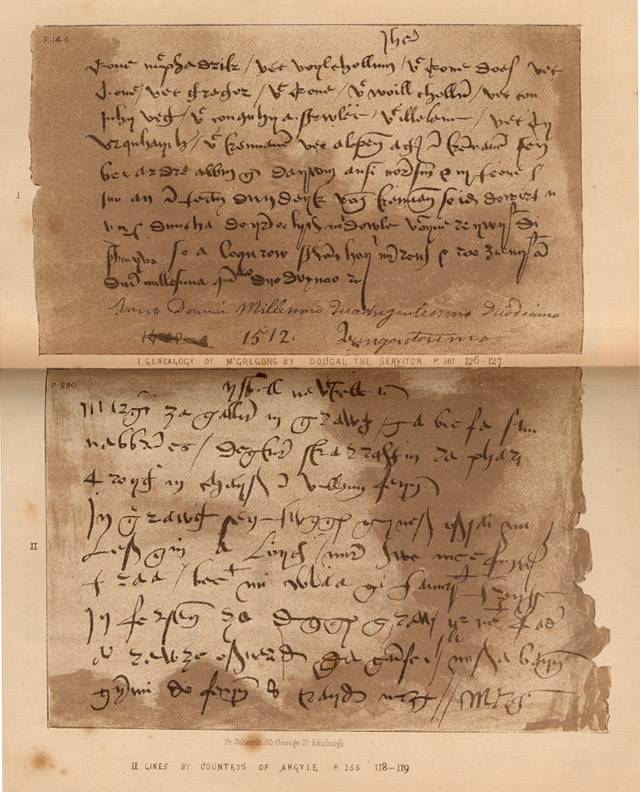
Book of the Dean of Lismore (16th century), written in Scottish Gaelic

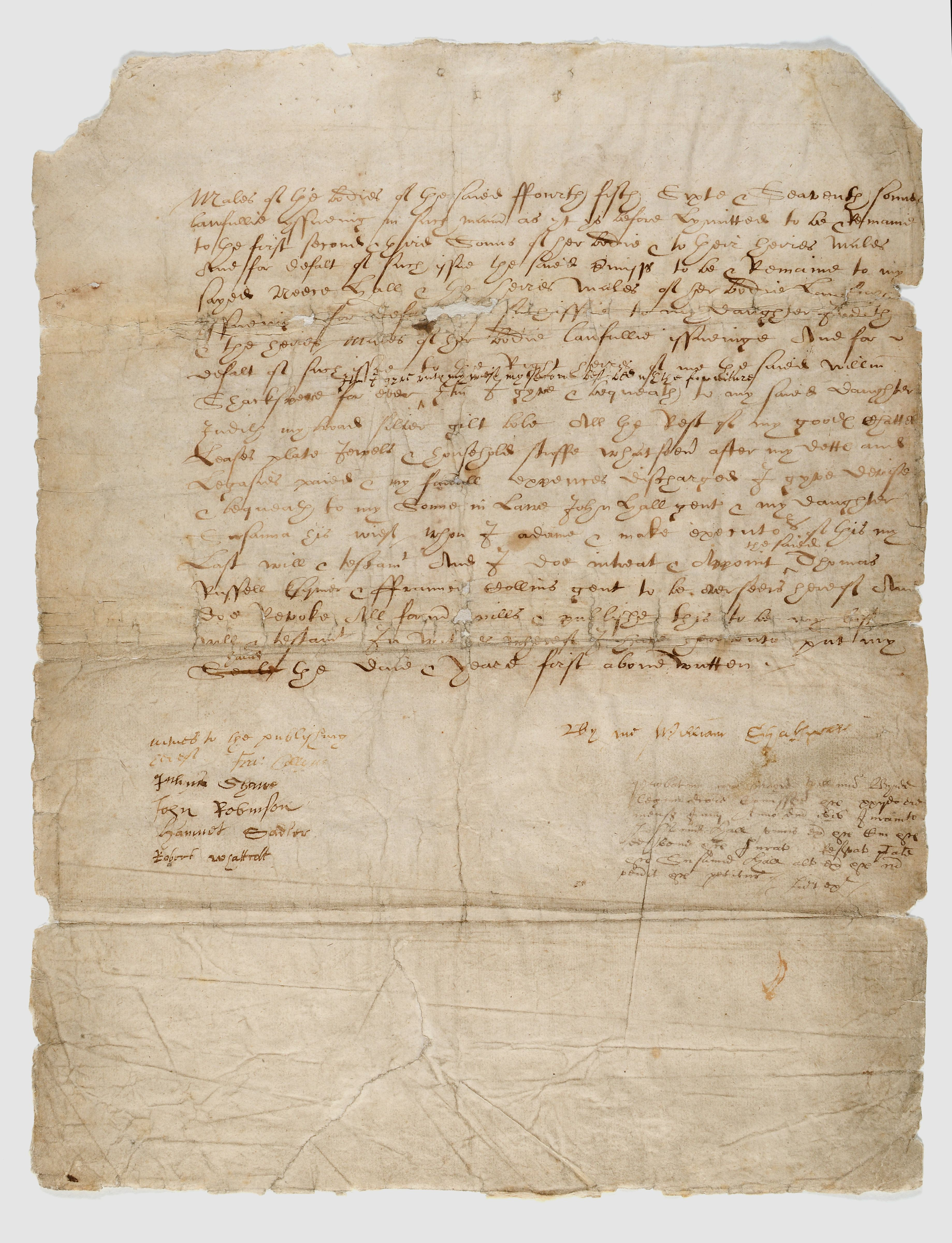
William Shakespeare's will, written in 1616

== See also ==
- Calligraphy – Writing as a visual art
- History of writing
