= Latin alphabet =

Alphabet of the Latin language

Latin alphabet Abecedarium Latinum
- Script type: Alphabet
- Period: c. 700 BC – present
- Official script: Roman Republic and Roman Empire
- Languages: Latin

Related scripts
- Parent systems: Egyptian hieroglyphs: Proto-Sinaitic alphabet; Phoenician alphabet; Greek alphabet; Old Italic scripts; Latin alphabet
- Child systems: Numerous Latin alphabets; also more divergent derivations such as Osage
- Sister systems: Cyrillic; Coptic; Armenian; Georgian; Runic

ISO 15924
- ISO 15924: Latn (215), Latin

Unicode
- Unicode alias: Latin
- Unicode range: See Latin script in Unicode

The Latin alphabet is the set of letters used by the ancient Romans to write Classical Latin, later augmented with lower-case letters to write Medieval Latin. Its expansion into the core 26-letter modern inventory (standardised today as the ISO basic Latin alphabet, which is utilized by Modern Latin), was motivated by vernacular languages.

This slightly expanded inventory resulted from the addition of ⟨W⟩ in the Middle Ages and the separation of ⟨J⟩ from ⟨I⟩ and ⟨U⟩ from ⟨V⟩ in the Early Modern era. This set of letters is the basis of the Latin script, the most widely used writing system in the world, but often with diacritics or additional letters. The Latin script is used to write over 3,000 languages, spoken by about 70% of the global population, principally in western and central Europe, sub-Saharan Africa, the Americas and Oceania.

== Etymology ==
The phrase Latin alphabet may refer to either the alphabet used to write Latin (as described in this article) or to other alphabets based on the Latin script, such as the English alphabet, which uses the basic set of letters of the extended Latin alphabet. These Latin-script alphabets may discard letters, like the Italian alphabet, or add new letters, like the Vietnamese or Hungarian alphabets. Letter shapes have evolved over the centuries, including the development in Medieval Latin of lower-case, forms which did not exist in the Classical period alphabet.

== Evolution ==
The Latin alphabet evolved from the visually similar Etruscan alphabet, which evolved from the Cumaean Greek version of the Greek alphabet, which was itself descended from the Phoenician alphabet, which in turn derived from Egyptian hieroglyphs. The Etruscans ruled early Rome; their alphabet evolved in Rome over successive centuries to produce the Latin alphabet. During the Middle Ages, the Latin alphabet was used (sometimes with modifications) for writing Romance languages, which are direct descendants of Latin, as well as for writing Celtic, Germanic, Baltic, Turkic and some Slavic languages. With the age of colonialism and Christian evangelism, the Latin script spread beyond Europe, coming into use for writing indigenous American, Australian, Austronesian, Austroasiatic and African languages. More recently, linguists have also tended to prefer the Latin script or the International Phonetic Alphabet (itself largely based on the Latin script) when transcribing or creating written standards for non-European languages, such as the African reference alphabet.

=== Signs and abbreviations ===
Although Latin did not use diacritical marks, apart from the apex and sicilicus, signs of truncation of words (often placed above or at the end of the truncated word) were very common. Furthermore, abbreviations or smaller overlapping letters were often used. This meant that if the text was engraved on stone, the number of letters to be engraved was reduced, while if it was written on paper or parchment, it saved precious space. This custom continued in the Middle Ages: hundreds of symbols and abbreviations exist, varying from century to century.

== History ==
Up until the Renaissance, the Latin alphabet was defective: The letters I and V each stood for two sounds, a consonant /j, w/ and a vowel /i, u/, a gap recognized by Classical writers. (See Claudian letters for an attempted remedy of /u/ vs /w/; Cicero also recommended double ⟨II⟩ for the medial geminate consonant /jj/.) Long vowels were optionally distinguished by an apex or the i longa ⟨ꟾ⟩, but the i longa in inscriptions stood for both long /iː/ and geminate /jj/.

=== Origins ===
It is generally believed that the Latin alphabet used by the Romans was derived from the Old Italic alphabet used by the Etruscans. That alphabet was derived from the Euboean alphabet used in Cumae, which in turn was derived from the Phoenician alphabet.

==== Old Italic alphabet ====
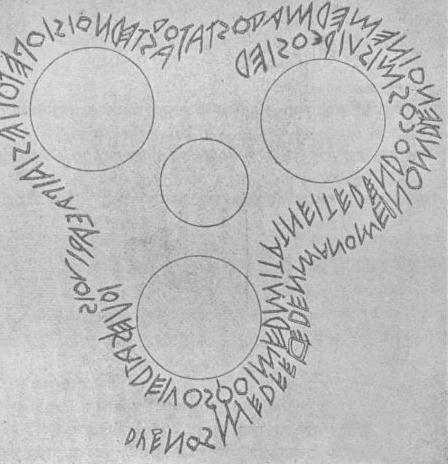
The Duenos inscription, dated to the 6th century BC, shows the earliest known form of the Old Latin alphabet.

Old Italic alphabet
Letters	𐌀	𐌁	𐌂	𐌃	𐌄	𐌅	𐌆	𐌇	𐌈	𐌉	𐌊	𐌋	𐌌	𐌍	𐌎	𐌏	𐌐	𐌑	𐌒	𐌓	𐌔	𐌕	𐌖	𐌗	𐌘	𐌙	𐌚
Transliteration	A	B	C	D	E	V	Z	H	Θ	I	K	L	M	N	Ξ	O	P	Ś	Q	R	S	T	Y	X	Φ	Ψ	F

==== Archaic Latin alphabet ====
Archaic Latin alphabet
As Old Italic	𐌀	𐌁	𐌂	𐌃	𐌄	𐌅	𐌆	𐌇	𐌉	𐌊	𐌋	𐌌	𐌍	𐌏	𐌐	𐌒	𐌓	𐌔	𐌕	𐌖	𐌗
As Latin	A	B	C	D	E	F	Z	H	I	K	L	M	N	O	P	Q	R	S	T	V	X

==== Old Latin alphabet ====
Latin included 21 different characters. The letter ⟨C⟩ was the western form of the Greek gamma, but it was used for the sounds /ɡ/ and /k/ alike, possibly under the influence of Etruscan, which may have lacked any voiced plosives. Later, probably during the 3rd century BC, the letter ⟨Z⟩ – not needed to write Latin properly – was replaced with the new letter ⟨G⟩, a ⟨C⟩ modified with a small vertical stroke, which took its place in the alphabet. From then on, ⟨G⟩ represented the voiced plosive /ɡ/, while ⟨C⟩ was generally reserved for the voiceless plosive /k/. The letter ⟨K⟩ was used only rarely, in a small number of words such as Kalendae, often interchangeably with ⟨C⟩.

Old Latin alphabet
Letter	A	B	C	D	E	F	G	H	I	K	L	M	N	O	P	Q	R	S	T	V	X

==== Classical Latin alphabet ====
After the Roman conquest of Greece in the 1st century BC, Latin adopted the Greek letters ⟨Y⟩ and ⟨Z⟩ (or readopted, in the latter case) to write Greek loanwords, placing them at the end of the alphabet. An attempt by the emperor Claudius to introduce three additional letters ⟨Ↄ, Ⅎ, Ⱶ⟩ did not last. Thus, it was during the classical Latin period that the Latin alphabet contained 21 letters and 2 foreign letters:

Classical Latin alphabet
Letter	A	B	C	D	E	F	G	H	I	K	L	M	N	O	P	Q	R	S	T	V	X	Y	Z
Latin name (majus)	á	bé	cé	dé	é	ef	gé	há	ꟾ	ká	el	em	en	ó	pé	qv́	er	es	té	v́	ix	ꟾ graeca	zéta
Transliteration	ā	bē	cē	dē	ē	ef	gē	hā	ī	kā	el	em	en	ō	pē	qū	er	es	tē	ū	ix	ī Graeca	zēta
Latin pronunciation (IPA)	aː	beː	keː	deː	eː	ɛf	ɡeː	haː	iː	kaː	ɛl	ɛm	ɛn	oː	peː	kuː	ɛr	ɛs	teː	uː	iks	iː ˈɡraɪka	ˈdzeːta

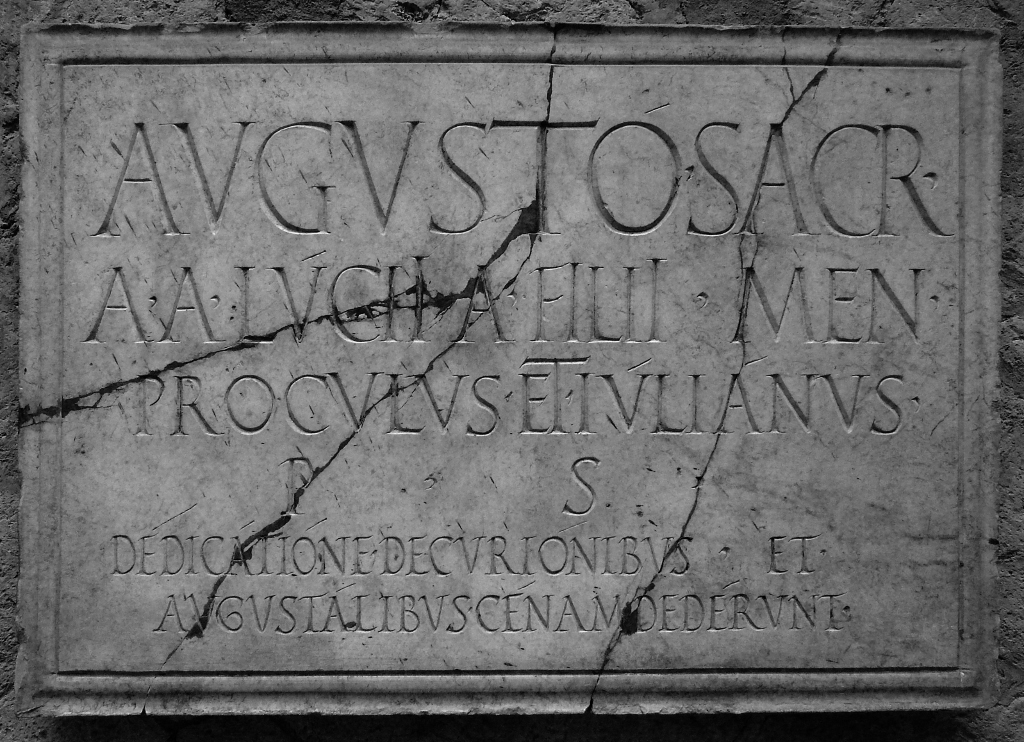
The apices in this first-century inscription are very light. (There is one over the ó in the first line.) The vowel I is written taller rather than taking an apex. The interpuncts are comma-shaped, an elaboration of a more typical triangular shape. From the shrine of the Augustales at Herculaneum.

The names of these letters did not decline. They originally had neuter gender, as did the corresponding Greek letters, but were sometimes treated as feminine by analogy with the feminine word littera "letter".

The Latin names of some of these letters are disputed; for example, ⟨H⟩ may have been called [ˈaha] or [ˈaka]. In general the Romans did not use the traditional (Semitic-derived) names as in Greek: the names of the plosives were formed by adding /eː/ to their sound (except for ⟨K⟩ and ⟨Q⟩, which needed different vowels to be distinguished from ⟨C⟩) and the names of the continuants consisted as a rule either of the bare sound, or the sound preceded by /e/.

The letter ⟨Y⟩ when introduced was probably called "hy" /hyː/ as in Greek, the name upsilon not being in use yet, but this was changed to i Graeca ("Greek i") as Latin speakers had difficulty distinguishing its foreign sound /y/ from /i/. ⟨Z⟩ was given its Greek name, zeta. This scheme has continued to be used by most modern European languages that have adopted the Latin alphabet. For the Latin sounds represented by the various letters see Latin spelling and pronunciation; for the names of the letters in English see English alphabet.

Diacritics were not regularly used, but they did occur sometimes, the most common being the apex used to mark long vowels, which had previously sometimes been written doubled. However, in place of taking an apex, the letter i was written taller: ⟨á é ꟾ ó v́⟩. For example, what is today transcribed Lūciī a fīliī was written ⟨lv́ciꟾ·a·fꟾliꟾ⟩ in the inscription depicted. Some letters have more than one form in epigraphy. Latinists have treated some of them especially such as ⟨Ꟶ⟩, a variant of ⟨H⟩ found in Roman Gaul.

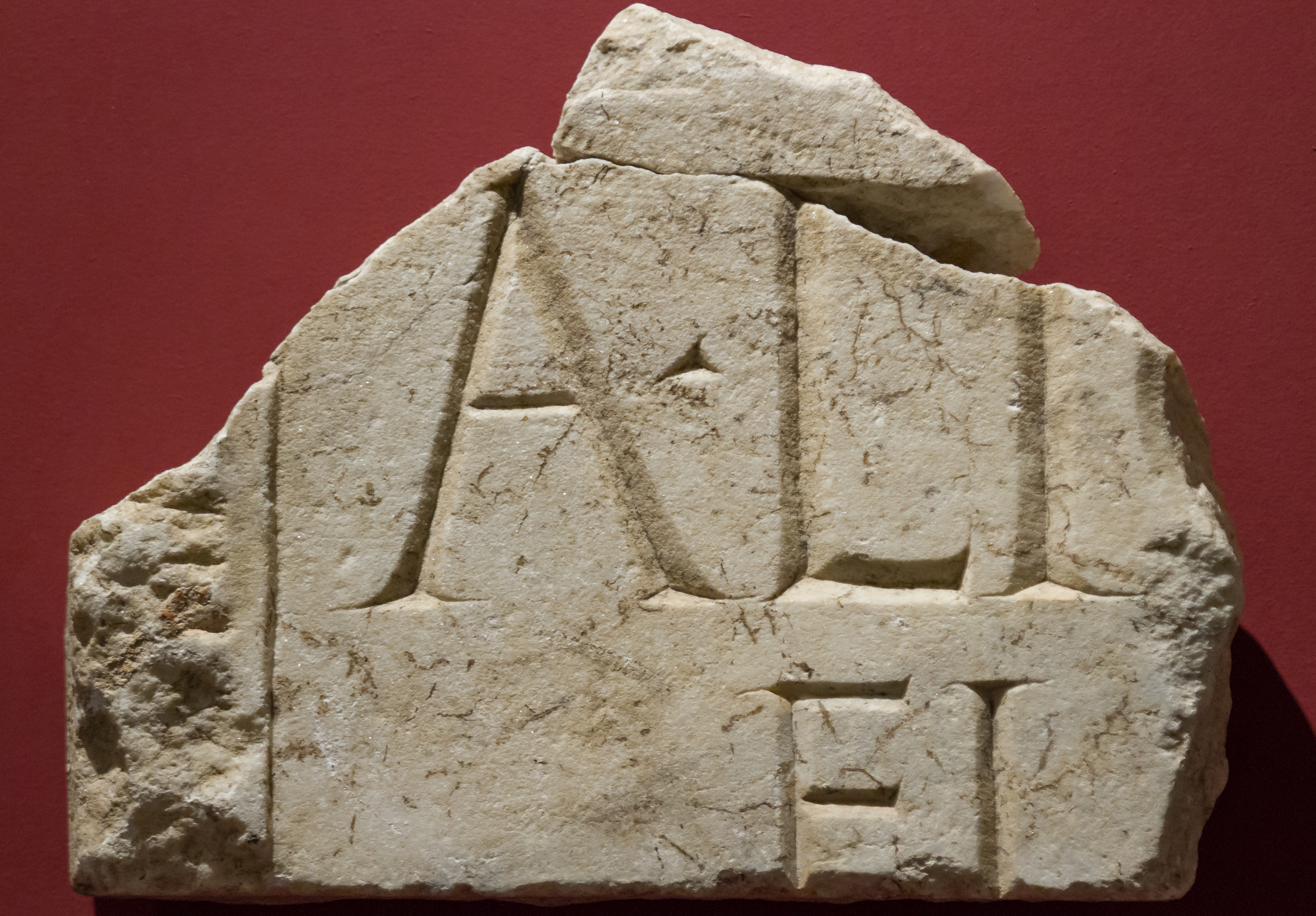
Inscription with triangle-shaped interpunct, 1st century.

The primary mark of punctuation was the interpunct, which was used as a word divider, though it fell out of use after 200 AD.

Old Roman cursive script, also called majuscule cursive and Capitalis cursive, was the everyday form of handwriting used for writing letters, by merchants writing business accounts, by schoolchildren learning the Latin alphabet, and even emperors issuing commands. A more formal style of writing was based on Roman square capitals, but cursive was used for quicker, informal writing. It was most commonly used from about the 1st century BC to the 3rd century, but it probably existed earlier than that. It led to Uncial, a majuscule script commonly used from the 3rd to 8th centuries AD by Latin and Greek scribes. Tironian notes were a shorthand system consisting of thousands of signs.

New Roman cursive script, also known as minuscule cursive, was in use from the 3rd century to the 7th century, and uses letter forms that are more recognizable to modern eyes; ⟨a⟩, ⟨b⟩, ⟨d⟩, and ⟨e⟩ had taken a more familiar shape, and the other letters were proportionate to each other. This script evolved into a variety of regional medieval scripts (for example, the Merovingian, Visigothic and Benevantan scripts), to be later supplanted by the Carolingian minuscule.

=== Medieval and later developments ===
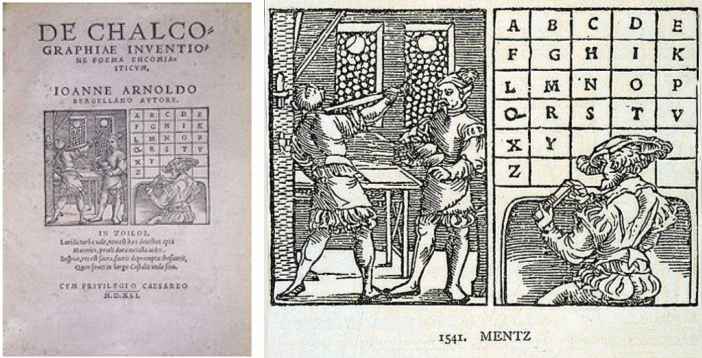
De chalcographiae inventione (1541, Mainz) with the 23 letters. J, U and W are missing.

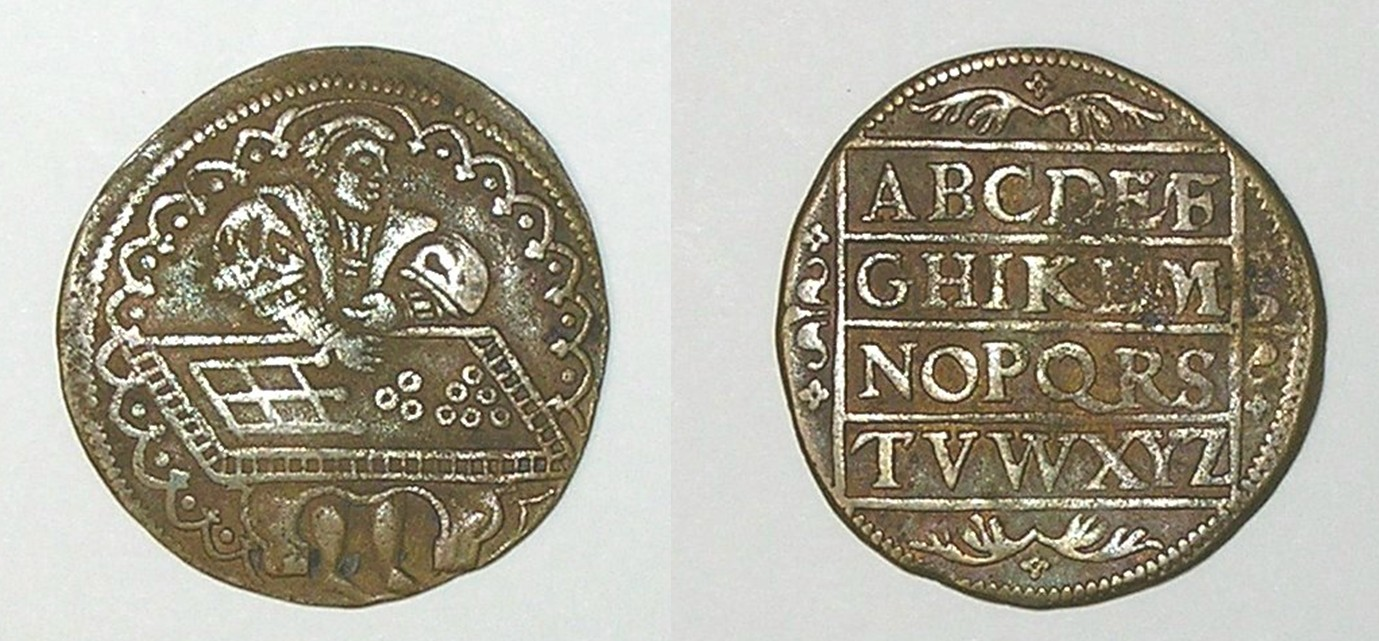
Jeton from Nuremberg, c. 1553

It was not until the Middle Ages that the letter ⟨W⟩ (originally a ligature of two ⟨V⟩s) was added to the Latin alphabet, to represent sounds from the Germanic languages which did not exist in medieval Latin, and only after the Renaissance did the convention of treating ⟨I⟩ and ⟨U⟩ as vowels, and ⟨J⟩ and ⟨V⟩ as consonants, become established. Prior to that they were allographs.

With the fragmentation of political power, the style of writing changed and varied greatly throughout the Middle Ages, even after the invention of the printing press. Early deviations from the classical forms were the uncial script, a development of the Old Roman cursive, and various so-called minuscule scripts that developed from New Roman cursive, of which the insular script developed by Irish literati and derivations of this, such as Carolingian minuscule were the most influential, introducing the lower case forms of the letters, as well as other writing conventions that have since become standard.

The languages that use the Latin script generally use capital letters to begin paragraphs and sentences and proper nouns. The rules for capitalization have changed over time, and different languages have varied in their rules for capitalization. Old English, for example, was rarely written with even proper nouns capitalized, whereas Modern English writers and printers of the 17th and 18th century frequently capitalized most and sometimes all nouns; for example, from the preamble of the United States Constitution:

We the People of the United States, in Order to form a more perfect Union, establish Justice, insure domestic Tranquility, provide for the common defence, promote the general Welfare, and secure the Blessings of Liberty to ourselves and our Posterity, do ordain and establish this Constitution for the United States of America.

This is still systematically done in modern German.

== See also ==
- Calligraphy – Writing as a visual art
- Euboean alphabet – Local variants of the ancient Greek alphabet
- ISO basic Latin alphabet – 26 letters in two cases broadly used in international communication
- Latin script in Unicode – Characters from the Latin script encoded in the Unicode Standard
- Latin spelling and pronunciation
- Latin-1 – Character encoding of Latin script
- Legacy of the Roman Empire
- Palaeography – Study of handwriting and manuscripts
- Phoenician alphabet – Writing system used c. 1050 to 146 BC
- Pinyin – Romanization scheme for Standard Chinese
- Roman letters used in mathematics
- Spread of the Latin script
- Typography – Art of arranging type
- Western Latin character sets (computing) – Technically obsolete extensions to ASCII
