= Laurentius of Echternach =

Laurentius of Echternach, fl. 704–722, was a scribe from Echternach in modern Luxembourg.

Laurentius wrote the Echternach martyrology in minuscule, and charters for the town of Echternach between 704 and 722.

His name may be a Latin rendering of the Irish personal name, Lorcán, so there is a possibility he was Irish
