= Spoken Latin =

Spoken Latin may refer to:

- Vulgar Latin, the range of non-formal registers of Latin spoken from the Late Roman Republic onward
- Living Latin, also called Active Latin, an effort to revive classical Latin as a contemporary spoken conversational language
- Neo-Latin, a form of spoken Latin and written Latin used by European scholars, scientists, academics and diplomats from the Renaissance up to the 1700s
- Latin regional pronunciation, a list of regional variations of Latin pronunciation
