= Latin diacritics =

Latin diacritics may refer to:

- diacritics of the Latin alphabet
- diacritics used in the Latin language (see Latin spelling and pronunciation § Letters and phonemes)
