= Italianate (disambiguation) =

Italianate is a term meaning "Italian in style or character". It may refer more specifically to:

- Italianate architecture
- Italianate Latin, a pronunciation of Latin
- Italianate Renaissance, the style of the Italian Renaissance
- Italianate-style fortifications
