= Apex (diacritic) =

Latin diacritic similar to an acute accent

Various forms of the apex mark.

In written Latin, the apex (plural "apices") is a mark with roughly the shape of an acute accent (´) or apostrophe (ʼ) that was sometimes placed over vowels to indicate that they were long.

The shape and length of the apex can vary, sometimes within a single inscription. While virtually all apices consist of a line sloping up to the right, the line can be more or less curved, and varies in length from less than half the height of a letter to more than the height of a letter. Sometimes, it is adorned at the top with a distinct hook, protruding to the left. Rather than being centered over the vowel it modifies, the apex is often considerably displaced to the right.

Essentially the same diacritic, conventionally called in English the acute accent, is used today for the same purpose of denoting long vowels in a number of languages with Latin orthography, such as Irish (called in it the síneadh fada [ˈʃiːnʲə ˈfˠad̪ˠə] or simply fada "long"), Hungarian (hosszú ékezet [ˈhosːuː ˈeːkɛzɛt], from the words for "long" and "wedge"), Czech (called in it čárka [ˈtʃaːrka], "small line") and Slovak (dĺžeň [ˈdl̩ːʐeɲ], from the word for "long"), as well as for the historically long vowels of Icelandic and Faroese.

== Details ==
Apices are usually thinner than the lines that compose the letters on which they stand. They appear in both epigraphic and palaeographic texts, although they are not always included in transcriptions.

An apex was initially not used over ⟨i⟩; instead, the letter is written taller (as a "long i"), as in lv́ciꟾ·a·fꟾliꟾ (Lūciī A. fīliī) in the next illustration. However, by the 2nd century AD even this long I was given an apex, and the apex could thus appear over all of the Latin vowels.

Other markers of long vowels are attested, such as the reduplication of the vowel and the use of <ei> for long /i/ in archaic epigraphy, but the apex was the standard vowel-length indicator in classical times. The grammarian Quintilian wrote that apices are necessary when a difference of quantity in a vowel changes the meaning of a word, as in malus and málus, but recommended against including them otherwise, as he believed that the presence of long vowels was otherwise obvious to everyone. Terentius Scaurus had a similar recommendation. Long vowels were never indicated consistently; writers most often marked them in grammatical endings, to avoid visual confusion with other letters, and to denote phrasal units.

== Identification with the sicilicus ==
The apex is often discussed in relation to the sicilicus, a Latin diacritic mentioned by grammarians and attested in a handful of inscriptions, which was a curved line used above consonants to denote that they should be pronounced double. Revilo P. Oliver has argued that they are the same sign, a mark of gemination which was used over any letter to indicate that the letter should be read twice, as a long vowel or geminate consonant. The distinction between a sicilicus that was used above consonants and an apex that was applied to vowels is then completely artificial: "There is no example of this mark [the sicilicus] that can be distinguished from an apex by any criterion other than its presence above a letter that is not a long vowel," Oliver writes, and "No ancient source says explicitly that there were two different signs...".

Some aspects of Oliver's theory have generally been corroborated by more recent research, while other aspects have been challenged.

== Gallery ==
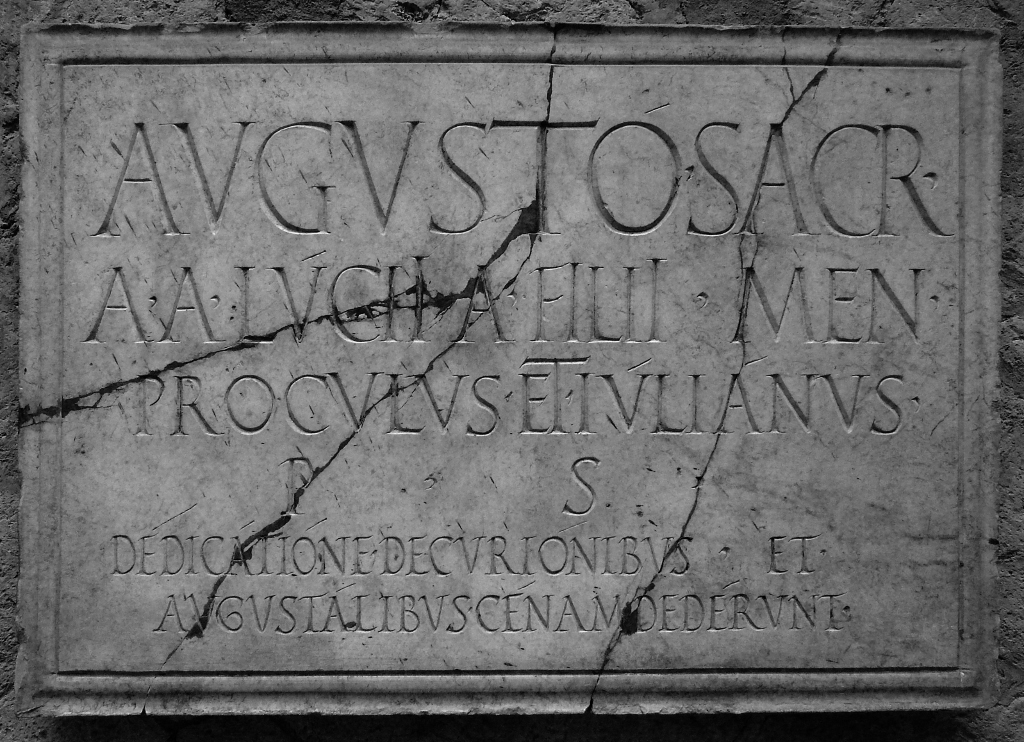
Inscription displaying very thin apices and long i. Herculaneum, 1st century CE. avgvstó · sacr / a · a · lv́ciꟾ · a · fꟾliꟾ · men
procvlvs · et · iv́liánvs
p · s
dédicátióne · decvriónibvs · et
avgvstálibvs · cénam · dedérvnt

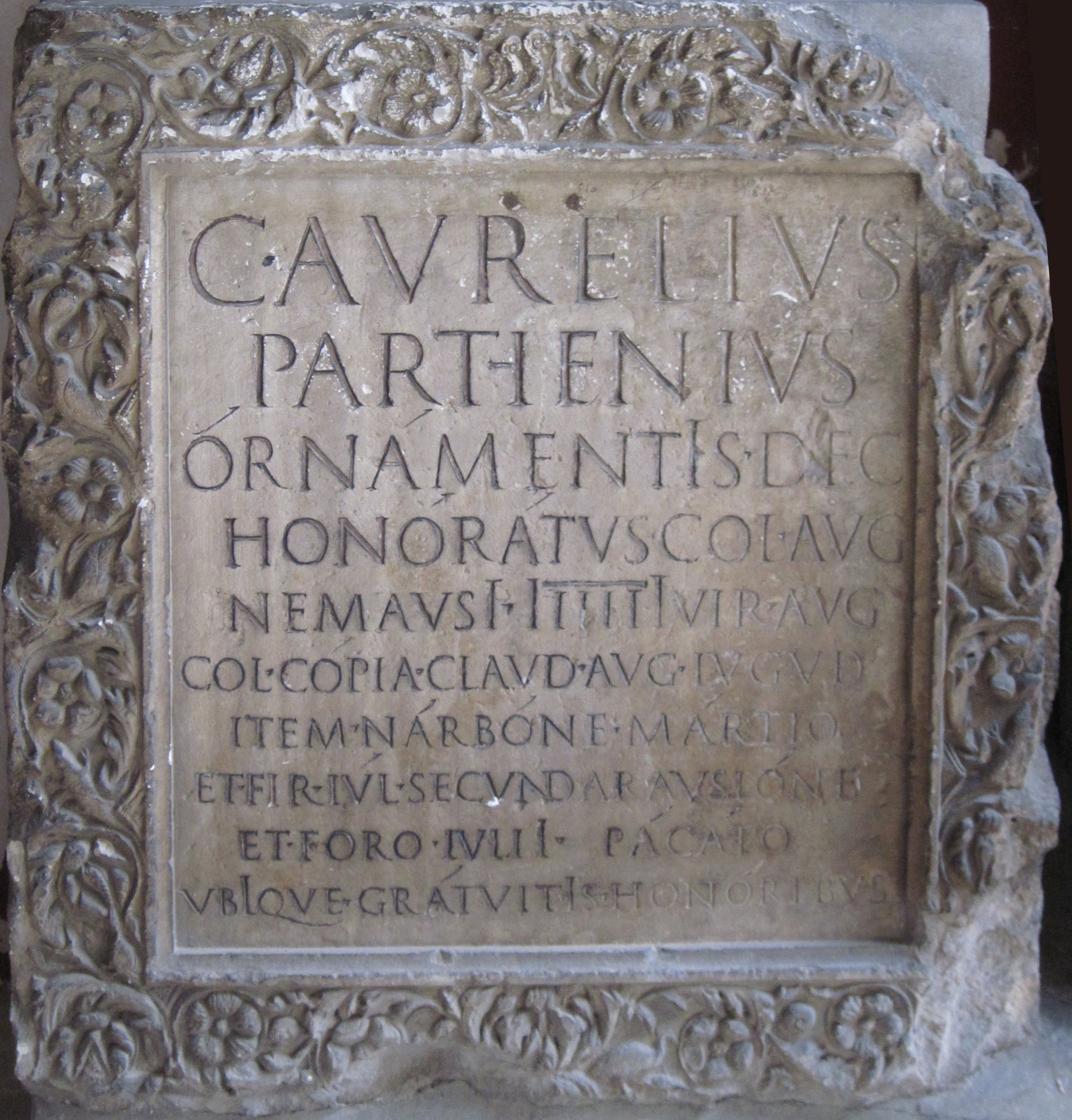
Epitaph displaying apices and long i. Nimes, 1st–2nd century CE. C(aivs) · Avrelivs
Parthenivs
órnámentꟾs · dec(vrionalibus)
honórátvs · col(oniae) · aug(ustae)
nemavsꟾ ꟾi̅i̅i̅i̅ꟾvir · avg(vstalis)
col(onia) · cópia · clavd(ia) · avg(usta) · lvgvd(vnensis)
item · nárbóne mártio
et · fir(ma) · Iv́l(ia) · secvnd(anorum) · aravsióne
et · foro · ivliꟾ pácáto
vbꟾqve · grátvitꟾs · honóribvs

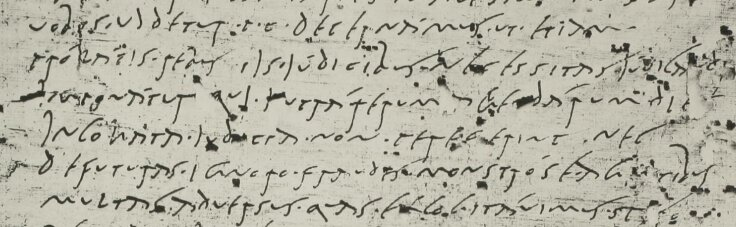
Papyrus fragment written in Roman cursive showing apices.
uobis · ujdetur · p · c · decernám(us · ut · etiam)
prólátis · rebus ijs · júdicibus · n(ecessitas · judicandi)
imponátur quj · jntrá rerum (· agendárum · dies)
jncoháta · judicia · non · per(egerint · nec)
defuturas · ignoro · fraudes · m(onstrósa · agentibus)
multas · aduersus · quas · exc(ogitáuimus)...

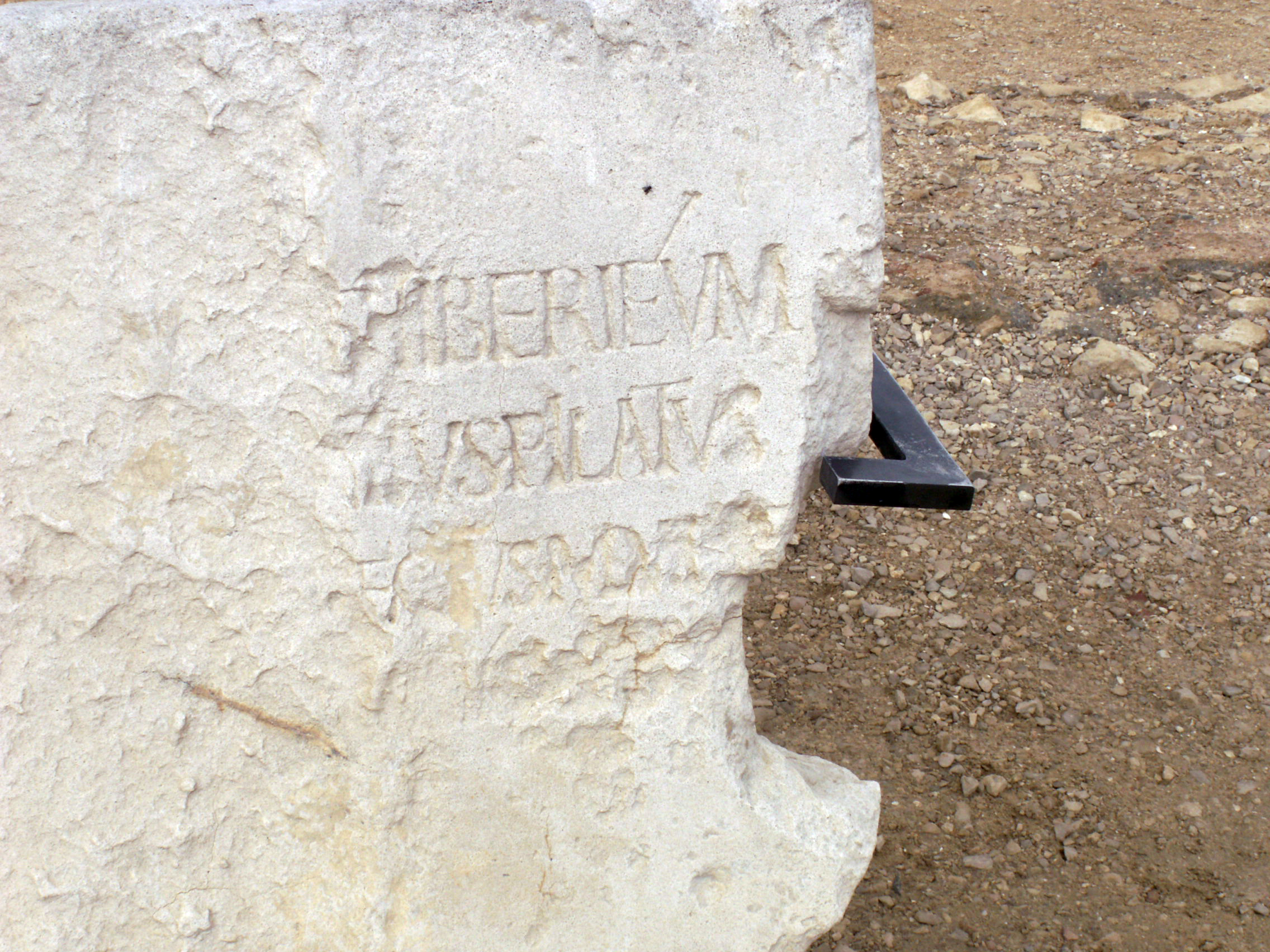
The Pilate stone (1st century AD?), displaying a large apex mark.

== See also ==
- Acute accent
- Latin spelling
