= Latin phonology and orthography =

Latin phonology is the system of sounds used in Latin. Classical Latin was spoken from the late Roman Republic to the early Empire: evidence for its pronunciation is taken from comments by Roman grammarians, common spelling mistakes, transcriptions into other languages, and the outcomes of various sounds in the Romance languages.

Latin orthography is the writing system used to spell Latin from its archaic stages down to the present. Latin was nearly always spelt in the Latin alphabet, but further details varied from period to period. The alphabet developed from Old Italic script, which had developed from a variant of the Greek alphabet, which in turn had developed from a variant of the Phoenician alphabet. The Latin alphabet most resembles the Greek alphabet that can be seen on black-figure pottery dating to c. 540 BC, especially the Euboean regional variant.

As the language continued to be used as a classical language, lingua franca and liturgical language long after it ceased being a native language, pronunciation and – to a lesser extent – spelling diverged significantly from the classical standard with Latin words being pronounced differently by native speakers of different languages. While nowadays a reconstructed classical pronunciation aimed to be that of the 1st century AD is usually employed in the teaching of Latin, the Italian-influenced ecclesiastical pronunciation as used by the Catholic church is still in common use. The Traditional English pronunciation of Latin has all but disappeared from classics education but continues to be used for Latin-based loanwords and use of Latin e.g. for binominal names in taxonomy.

During most of the time written Latin was in widespread use, authors variously complained about language change or attempted to "restore" an earlier standard. Such sources are of great value in reconstructing various stages of the spoken language (the Appendix Probi is an important source for the spoken variety in the 4th century CE, for example) and have in some cases indeed influenced the development of the language. The efforts of Renaissance Latin authors were to a large extent successful in removing innovations in grammar, spelling and vocabulary present in Medieval Latin but absent in both classical and contemporary Latin.

== Letterforms ==
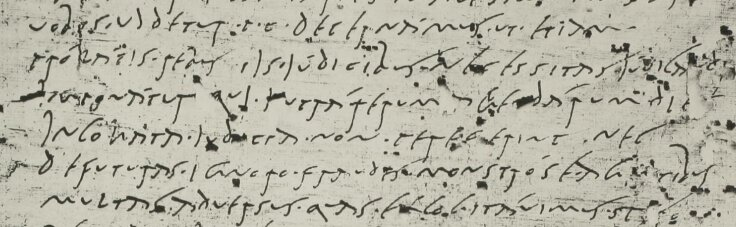
A papyrus fragment in Roman cursive with portions of speeches delivered in the Roman Senate

In Classical times there was no modern-like distinction between upper case and lower case. Inscriptions typically use square capitals, in letterforms largely corresponding to modern upper-case, and handwritten text was generally in the form of cursive, which includes letterforms corresponding to modern lowercase.

== Letters and phonemes ==
In Classical spelling, individual letters mainly corresponded to individual phonemes (alphabetic principle). Exceptions include:

1. The letters ⟨a⟩, ⟨e⟩, ⟨i⟩, ⟨o⟩, ⟨u⟩ and ⟨y⟩, each of which could represent either a short vowel or a long one. The long vowels were sometimes marked with apices, as in ⟨á⟩, ⟨é⟩, ⟨ó⟩, ⟨ú⟩ and ⟨ý⟩, while long /iː/ could be marked with long I ⟨ꟾ⟩. Since the 19th century, long vowels have been marked with macrons, as in ⟨ā⟩, ⟨ē⟩, ⟨ī⟩, ⟨ō⟩, ⟨ū⟩ and ⟨ȳ⟩; sometimes, breves may also be used to indicate short vowels, as in ⟨ă⟩, ⟨ĕ⟩, ⟨ĭ⟩, ⟨ŏ⟩, ⟨ŭ⟩, and ⟨y̆⟩.
2. The letters ⟨i⟩ and ⟨u⟩, which could either indicate vowels (as mentioned) or the consonants /j/ and /w/, respectively. In modern times, the letters ⟨j⟩ and ⟨v⟩ began to be used as distinct spellings for these consonants (now often pronounced very differently).
3. Digraphs such as ⟨ae⟩, ⟨au⟩ and ⟨oe⟩, which represented the diphthongs /ae̯/, /au̯/ and /oe̯/. In a few words, these could also stand for sequences of two adjacent vowels, which is sometimes marked by the use of a diaeresis in modern transcriptions, as in ⟨aë⟩, ⟨aü⟩ and ⟨oë⟩.
4. The digraphs ⟨ph⟩, ⟨th⟩ and ⟨ch⟩, standing for the aspirated consonants /pʰ/, /tʰ/ and /kʰ/ (initially written in loanwords from Greek, and subsequently in some native Latin words and loanwords from Italic languages which used the same sounds).

=== Consonants ===
Below are the distinctive (i.e. phonemic) consonants that are assumed for Classical Latin.

		Labial	Coronal	Palatal	Velar		Glottal
		Labial	Coronal	Palatal	plain	labial	Glottal
Plosive	voiceless	p	t		k	(kʷ)	
Plosive	voiced	b	d		ɡ	(ɡʷ)	
Plosive	aspirated	(pʰ)	(tʰ)		(kʰ)		
Fricative	voiceless	f	s				h
Fricative	voiced		z				
Nasal		m	n				
Rhotic			r				
Approximant			l	j		w	

==== Phonetics ====
- Latin may have had the labialized velar stops /kʷ/ and /ɡʷ/ as opposed to the stop + semivowel sequences /kw/ and /ɡw/ (as in the English quick or penguin). The argument for /kʷ/ is stronger than that for /ɡʷ/. (Note: Allen 1978 (p. 17) judges the evidence to favour /kʷ/ and /ɡʷ/, while Cser 2020 (§2.2.2) comes to the opposite conclusion. The relevant facts, per the latter, are as follows: ⟨qu⟩ enjoyed a wide lexical distribution, while ⟨gu(V)⟩ was limited to a dozen or so words, where it was always preceded by /n/. The grammarian Velius Longus indicated that the ⟨u⟩ of ⟨qu⟩ was in some way different from /w/ in general. No geminate *⟨qqu⟩ is attested, whereas all (other) Latin stops are also found as geminates. Sequences of obstruent + glide are rare in Classical Latin. In poetry, whenever sequences of stop + glide occur in medial position, the scansion reveals that can be split across syllables, but this is never the case for ⟨qu⟩. Neither ⟨qu⟩ nor ⟨gu⟩ are ever followed by a consonant, unlike any (other) Latin stop, nor can they occur word-finally. The voicing contrast between ⟨nqu⟩ and ⟨ngu⟩ is not found in any (other) sequence of three consonants. Assimilation of the prefix ad- to a following ⟨qu⟩ is relatively rare, which is also the case when ad- is followed by a consonant cluster. The Proto-Indo-European predecessor of Latin ⟨qu⟩ is, in many cases, reconstructed as a single consonant */kʷ/, notably distinct from sequences of */kw/. Occasionally Latin /w/ scans as a vowel in poetry, when preceded by /s/ or /l/, but this is never the case for the ⟨u⟩ of ⟨qu⟩.)
- The former could occur between vowels, where it always counted as a single consonant in Classical poetry, whereas the latter only occurred after /n/, where it is impossible to tell whether it counted as one consonant or two. The labial element, whether [ʷ] or [w], appears to have been palatalised before a front vowel, resulting in [ᶣ] or Voiced labial–palatal approximant [ɥ] (for instance quī would have sounded something like [kɥiː]). This palatalisation did not affect the independent consonant /w/ before front vowels.
- /kʷ/ and /ɡʷ/ before /u/ were not distinct from /k/ and /ɡ/, which were allophonically labialized to [kʷ] and [ɡʷ] by a following /u/ such that writing a double ⟨uu⟩ was unnecessary. This is suggested by the fact that equus and unguunt (from Old Latin equos and unguont) are also found spelt as ecus and ungunt.
- /p/, /t/ and /k/ were less aspirated than the corresponding English consonants, as implied by their usually being transliterated into Ancient Greek as ⟨π⟩, ⟨τ⟩ and ⟨κ⟩, and their pronunciation in most Romance languages. In many cases, however, it was not the Latin /p/ and /k/, but rather /b/ and /ɡ/, that were used to render Greek word-initial /p/ and /k/ in borrowings (as in πύξος, κυβερνῶ > buxus, guberno), especially borrowings of a non-learned character. This might suggest that the Latin /p/ and /k/ had some degree of aspiration, making /b/ and /ɡ/ more suitable to approximate the Greek sounds.
- /pʰ/, /tʰ/ and /kʰ/ were pronounced with notable aspiration, like the initial consonants of the English pot, top, and cot respectively. They are attested beginning c. 150 BC, in the spellings ⟨ph⟩, ⟨th⟩ and ⟨ch⟩, at first only used to render the Greek ⟨φ⟩, ⟨θ⟩ and ⟨χ⟩ in loanwords. (Previously these had been rendered in Latin as ⟨p⟩, ⟨t⟩ and ⟨c⟩.) From c. 100 BC onward ⟨ph⟩, ⟨th⟩ and ⟨ch⟩ spread to a number of native Latin words as well, such as pulcher and lachrima. When this occurred it was nearly always in the vicinity of the consonant /r/ or /l/, and the implication is that Latin /p/, /t/ and /k/ had become aspirated in that context.
- /z/ was found as a rendering of the Greek ⟨ζ⟩ in borrowings starting around the first century BC. (In earlier borrowings, the Greek sound had been rendered in Latin as /ss/.) In initial position, /z/ appears to have been pronounced [z], and between vowels it appears to have been doubled to [zz] (counted as two consonants in poetry).
- /s/ was unvoiced in all positions in Classical Latin. Previously, however, Old Latin written ⟨s⟩ appears to have been voiced to [z] between vowels (intervocalic), ultimately becoming written ⟨r⟩ (rhotacism). Cicero reports the family-name Papisius being changed to Papirius in the fourth century BC, which may give some idea of the chronology. Afterward new instances of /s/ developed between vowels from sound-changes like the degemination of /ss/ after long vowels and diphthongs (as in caussa > causa), which Quintilian reports to have happened a little after the time of Cicero and Virgil.
- In Old Latin, final /s/ after a short vowel was often lost, probably after first debuccalizing to [h], as in the inscriptional form Cornelio for Cornelios (Classical Cornelius). Often in the poetry of Plautus, Ennius, and Lucretius, final /s/ did not count as a consonant when followed by a word beginning with a consonant. By the Classical period this practice was described as characteristic of non-urban speech by Cicero.
- /f/ was labiodental in Classical Latin but may have been a bilabial /ɸ/ in Old Latin, or perhaps [ɸ] in free variation with [f]. Lloyd, Sturtevant, and Kent make this argument based on misspellings in early inscriptions, the fact that many instances of Latin /f/ descend from Proto-Indo-European /bʰ/, and the outcomes of the sound in Romance (particularly in Spain).
- In most cases /m/ was pronounced as a bilabial nasal. At the end of a word, however, it was generally lost beginning in Old Latin (except when another nasal or a plosive followed it), leaving compensatory lengthening and nasalization on the preceding vowel (such that decem may have sounded something like, i.e. [ˈdɛkẽː]). In Old Latin inscriptions, final ⟨m⟩ is often omitted, as in ⟨viro⟩ for virom (Classical virum). It was frequently elided before a following vowel in poetry and lost without a trace (apart from perhaps lengthening) in the Romance languages, except in a number of monosyllabic words, where it often survives as /n/ or a further development thereof.
- /n/ and /m/ merged via assimilation before a following consonant, with the following consonant determining the resulting pronunciation: bilabial [m] before a bilabial consonant (e.g. /p/ and /b/), coronal [n] before a coronal consonant (e.g. /t/ and /d/) and velar [ŋ] before a velar consonant (e.g. /k/, /kʷ/ and /ɡ/). This occurred both within words (e.g. quīnque may have sounded something like) and across word-boundaries (for instance in causā with [ŋ], or im pace).
- /ɡ/ assimilated to a velar nasal [ŋ] before /n/. Allen and Greenough say that a vowel before [ŋn] is always long, but W. Sidney Allen says that is based on an interpolation in Priscian, and the vowel was actually long or short depending on the root, as for example rēgnum from the root of rēx but magnus from the root of magis. /ɡ/ probably did not assimilate to [ŋ] before /m/. The cluster /ɡm/ arose by syncope, as for example tegmen from tegimen. Original /ɡm/ developed into /mm/ in flamma, from the root of flagrō. At the start of a word, original /ɡn/ was reduced to [n], and this change was reflected in the orthography of later texts, as in gnātus, gnōscō > nātus, nōscō.
- In Classical Latin, the rhotic /r/ was most likely an alveolar trill [r], at least in some positions and when doubled. Gaius Lucilius likened it to the sound of a dog, and later writers described it as being produced with vibration. In Old Latin, written ⟨s⟩ appearing between vowels (intervocalic) was initially pronounced [z], and developed into written ⟨r⟩ (rhotacism); Allen says this is suggestive of a fricative similar to English ⟨r⟩ in some pronunciations of the word draw ([ɹ̝]). Similarly, written ⟨d⟩ in intervocalic position became written ⟨r⟩, possibly suggesting a tap [ɾ] (like the Spanish singular ⟨r⟩, such as in caro; in some dialects of English, intervocalic ⟨d⟩ also shifts to this sound, such as in pedal).
- /l/ was strongly velarized in syllable coda and probably somewhat palatalized when geminated or followed by /i(ː)/. In intervocalic position, it appears to have been velarized before all vowels except /i(ː)/.
- /j/ generally appeared only at the beginning of words, before a vowel, as in iaceō, except in compound words such as adiaceō (pronounced something like). Between vowels, it was generally as a geminate /jj/, as in cuius (pronounced something like) except in compound words such as trāiectus. This /jj/ is sometimes marked in modern editions by a circumflex on the preceding vowel, e.g. cûius, êius, mâior, etc. /j/ could also have varied with /i/ in the same morpheme, as in iam /jam/ and etiam /ˈe.ti.am/, and in poetry one could be replaced with the other for metrical purpose.
- /w/ was pronounced as an approximant until the first century AD, when /w/ and intervocalic /b/ began to develop into fricatives. In poetry, /w/ and /u/ could be replaced with each other, as in /ˈsilua/~/ˈsilwa/ or /ˈɡenua/~/ˈɡenwa/. Unlike /j/ it remained a single consonant in most words, e.g. in cavē, although it did represent a double /ww/ in borrowings from Greek such as the name Evander.
- /h/ was generally still pronounced in Classical Latin, at least by educated speakers, but in many cases it appears to have been lost early on between vowels, and sometimes in other contexts as well (diribeō < *dis-habeō being a particularly early example). Where intervocalic /h/ survived, it was likely voiced (that is, [ɦ]).

==== Notes on spelling ====
- Doubled consonant letters represented genuinely doubled consonants, as in ⟨cc⟩ for /kk/. In Old Latin, geminate consonants were written as if they were single until the middle of the second century BC, when orthographic doubling began to appear. (Note: epistula ad tiburtes, a letter by praetor Lucius Cornelius from 159 BC, contains the first examples of doubled consonants in the words potuisse, esse, and peccatum (Clackson & Horrocks 2007, pp. 147, 149).) Grammarians mention the marking of double consonants with the sicilicus, a diacritic in the shape of a sickle. It appears in a few inscriptions of the Augustan era.
- ⟨c⟩ and ⟨k⟩ both represented /k/, whereas ⟨qu⟩ represented /kʷ/. ⟨c⟩ and ⟨q⟩ distinguish minimal pairs such as cui /kui̯/ and quī /kʷiː/. In Classical Latin ⟨k⟩ appeared in only a few words like kalendae, Karthagō – which could also be spelt calendae, Carthagō.
- ⟨x⟩ represented /ks/. It was borrowed from the Western Greek alphabet, where chi ⟨Χ⟩ stood for /ks/, and ⟨ΚΗ⟩ or ⟨Ψ⟩ for /kʰ/. This was unlike the usage of chi in the Ionic alphabet, where ⟨Χ⟩ stood for /kʰ/, with /ks/ instead represented by the letter xi ⟨Ξ⟩ and ⟨Ψ⟩ standing for /ps/.
- ⟨ks⟩ ⟨cs⟩ and ⟨xs⟩ were also used to spell /ks/ in Old Latin, but by the Classical period, ⟨xs⟩ was reserved for words containing the prefix ex- combined with a base starting with ⟨s⟩ (e.g. exsanguis).
- In Old Latin inscriptions, /k/ and /ɡ/ were not distinguished. They were both represented by ⟨c⟩ before ⟨e⟩ and ⟨i⟩, by ⟨q⟩ before ⟨o⟩ and ⟨u⟩, and by ⟨k⟩ before consonants or ⟨a⟩. The letterform ⟨c⟩ derives from the Greek gamma ⟨Γ⟩, which represented /ɡ/. Its use for /k/ may come from Etruscan, which did not distinguish voiced plosives from voiceless ones. In Classical Latin, ⟨c⟩ represented /ɡ/ only in the abbreviations c and cn, for Gaius and Gnaeus respectively.
- ⟨g⟩ was created in the third century BC to distinguish /ɡ/ from /k/. Its letterform derived from ⟨c⟩ with the addition of a diacritic or stroke. Plutarch attributes this innovation to Spurius Carvilius Ruga around 230 BC, but it may have originated with Appius Claudius Caecus in the fourth century BC.
- The cluster ⟨gn⟩ probably represented the consonant cluster [ŋn], at least between vowels, as in agnus [ˈäŋ.nʊs]. Vowels before this cluster were sometimes long and sometimes short.
- The digraphs ⟨ph⟩, ⟨th⟩, and ⟨ch⟩ represented the aspirated plosives /pʰ/, /tʰ/ and /kʰ/. They began to be used in writing around 150 BC, primarily as a transcription of Greek phi Φ, theta Θ, and chi Χ, as in Philippus, cithara, and achāia. Some native words were later also written with these digraphs, such as pulcher, lachrima, gracchus, triumphus, probably representing aspirated allophones of the voiceless plosives near /r/ and /l/. Aspirated plosives and the glottal fricative /h/ were also used hypercorrectively, an affectation satirized in Catullus 84.
- In Old Latin, Koine Greek initial /z/ and /zz/ between vowels were represented by ⟨s⟩ and ⟨ss⟩, as in sona from ζώνη and massa from μᾶζα. Around the second and first centuries B.C., the Greek letter zeta ⟨Ζ⟩ was adopted to represent /z/ and /zz/. However, the Vulgar Latin spellings ⟨z⟩ or ⟨zi⟩ for earlier ⟨di⟩ and ⟨d⟩ before ⟨e⟩, and the spellings ⟨di⟩ and ⟨dz⟩ for earlier ⟨z⟩, suggest the pronunciation /dz/, as for example ziomedis for diomedis, and diaeta for zeta.
- In ancient times ⟨V⟩ and ⟨I⟩ represented the approximant consonants /w/ and /j/, as well as the close vowels /u(ː)/ and /i(ː)/.
- ⟨i⟩ representing the consonant /j/ was usually not doubled in writing, so a single ⟨i⟩ represented double /jː/ or /jj/ and the sequences /ji/ and /jːi/, as in cuius for *cuiius /ˈkuj.jus/, conicit for *coniicit /ˈkon.ji.kit/, and reicit for *reiiicit /ˈrej.ji.kit/. Both the consonantal and vocalic pronunciations of ⟨i⟩ could occur in some of the same environments: compare māius /ˈmaj.jus/ with Gāius /ˈɡaː.i.us/, and Iūlius /ˈjuː.li.us/ with Iūlus /iˈuː.lus/. The vowel before a doubled /jː/ is sometimes marked with a macron, as in cūius. It indicates not that the vowel is long but that the first syllable is heavy from the double consonant.
- ⟨V⟩ between vowels represented single /w/ in native Latin words but double /ww/ in Greek loanwords. Both the consonantal and vocalic pronunciations of ⟨V⟩ sometimes occurred in similar environments, as in GENVA [ˈɡɛ.nu.ä] and SILVA [ˈsɪl.wä].

=== Vowels ===
==== Monophthongs ====
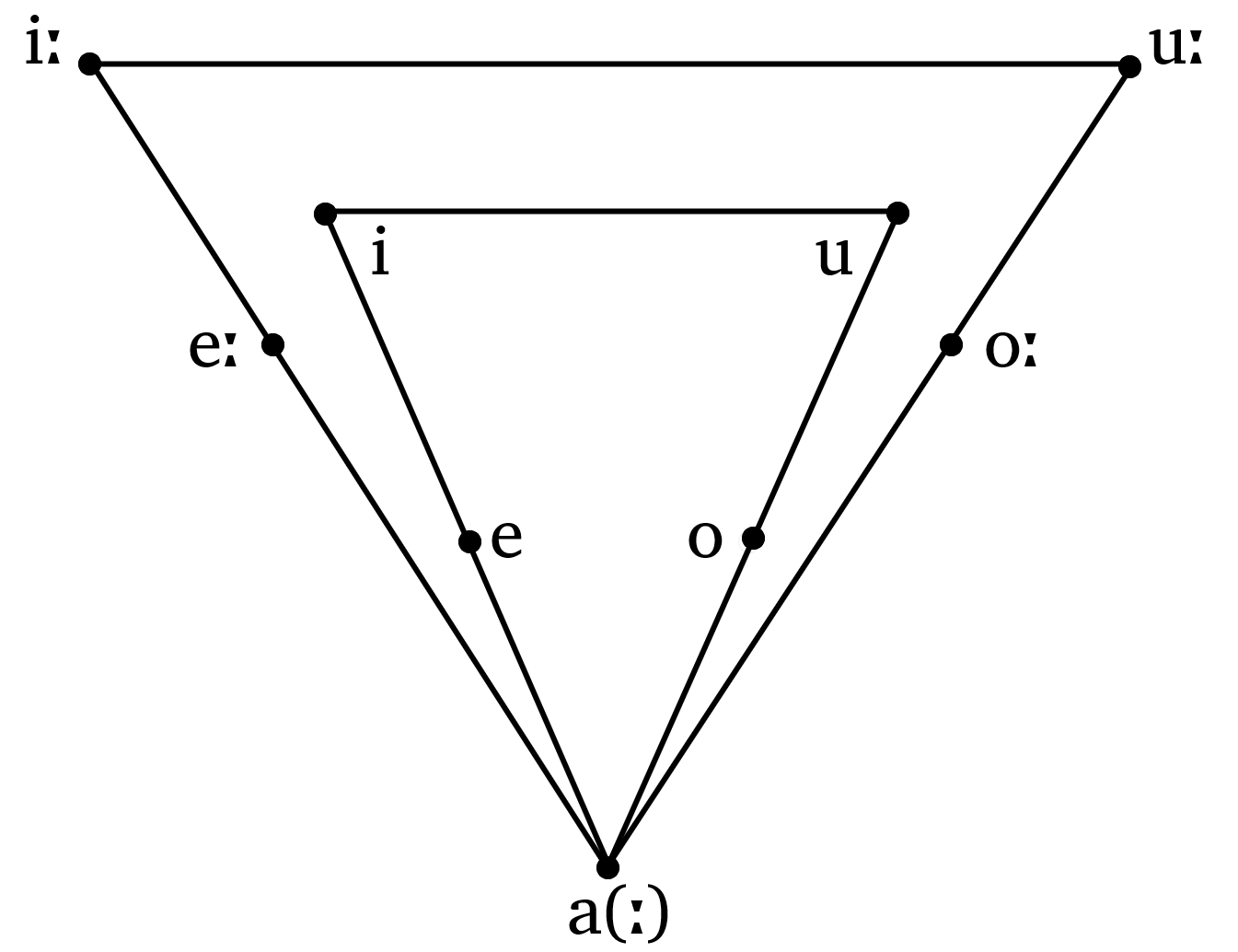
The Latin vowel-space per Allen 1978, p. 47

Classical Latin had ten native phonemic monophthongs: the five short vowels /i/, /e/, /a/, /o/ and /u/, and their long counterparts /iː/, /eː/, /aː/, /oː/ and /uː/. Two additional monophthongs, /y/ and /yː/, were sometimes used for ⟨y⟩ in loanwords from Greek by educated speakers, but most speakers would have approximated them with /i(ː)/ or /u(ː)/.

	Front		Central		Back	
	short	long	short	long	short	long
Close	i (y)	iː (yː)			u	uː
Mid	e	eː			o	oː
Open			a	aː		

==== Long and short vowels ====
The short vowels /i/, /e/, /o/ and /u/ may have been pronounced with a relatively open quality, which may be approximated as [ɪ] [ɛ] [ɔ] [ʊ], and the corresponding long vowels with a relatively close quality, approximately [iː] [eː] [oː] [uː]. (Note: There are alternate views, that the short high vowels /i/ and /u/ were tense [i] and [u] and that the long mid vowels /eː/ and /oː/ were lax [ɛː] and [ɔː], implying that none of the Latin short–long vowel pairs differed in quality, or that only the mid vowels differed in quality between long [eː] and [oː] and short [ɛ] and [ɔ] (Calabrese 2005) (Leppänen & Alho 2018).) That the short /i/ and /u/ were, as this implies, similar in quality to the long /eː/ and /oː/ is suggested by attested misspellings such as:

- ⟨trebibos⟩ for tribibus
- ⟨minsis⟩ for mēnsis
- ⟨sob⟩ for sub
- ⟨punere⟩ for pōnere

/e/ most likely had a more open allophone before /r/.

/e/ and /i/ were probably pronounced closer when they occurred before another vowel, with e.g. mea written as ⟨mia⟩ in some inscriptions. Short /i/ before another vowel is often written with the so-called long I, as in ⟨dꟾes⟩ for diēs, indicating that its quality was similar to that of long /iː/; it was almost never confused with ⟨e⟩ in this position.

==== Adoption of Greek upsilon ====
⟨y⟩ was used in Greek loanwords with upsilon ⟨Υ⟩. This letter represented the close front rounded vowel, both short and long: /y/ and /yː/. Latin did not have this sound as a native phoneme, and speakers tended to pronounce such loanwords with /u/ and /uː/ in Old Latin and /i/ and /iː/ in Classical and Late Latin if they were unable to produce /y/ and /yː/.

==== Sonus medius ====
An intermediate vowel sound (likely a close central vowel [ɨ] or possibly its rounded counterpart [ʉ], or even [ʏ]), called sonus medius, can be reconstructed for the classical period. Such a vowel is found in documentum, optimus, lacrima (also spelled docimentum, optumus, lacruma) and other words. It developed out of any historical short vowel in a non-initial open syllable by vowel reduction, probably first to [ə], later fronted to [ɪ] or [ɨ]. In the vicinity of labial consonants, this sound was not as fronted and may have retained some rounding, thus being more similar if not identical to the unreduced short /u/ [ʊ]. The Claudian letter Ⱶ ⱶ was possibly invented to represent this sound, but is never actually found used this way in the epigraphic record (it usually served as a replacement for the upsilon).

==== Vowel nasalization ====
Examples of nasalized vowels at ends of words and before -ns-, -nf- sequences
monstrum

mensis

infans, infantem

Vowels followed by a nasal consonant were allophonically realised as long nasal vowels in two environments:

- Before word-final ⟨m⟩:
  - monstrum /ˈmon.strum/ > [ˈmõː.strʊ̃]
  - dentem /ˈden.tem/ > [ˈdɛn.tɛ̃]
- Before nasal consonants followed by a fricative:
  - censor /ˈken.sor/ > [ˈkẽː.sɔr] (in early inscriptions, often written as cesor)
  - consul /ˈkon.sul/ > [ˈkõː.sʊɫ̪] (often written as cosol and abbreviated as cos)
  - inferōs /ˈin.fe.roːs/ > [ˈĩː.fæ.roːs] (written as iferos)

Those long nasal vowels had the same quality as ordinary long vowels. In Vulgar Latin, the vowels lost their nasalisation, and they merged with the long vowels (which were themselves shortened by that time). This is shown by many forms in the Romance languages, such as Spanish costar from Vulgar Latin cōstāre (originally cōnstāre) and Italian mese from Vulgar Latin mēse (Classical Latin mensem). On the other hand, the short vowel and /n/ were restored, for example, in French enseigne and enfant from insignia and infantem (⟨e⟩ is the normal development of Latin short ⟨i⟩), likely by analogy with other forms beginning in the prefix in-.

When a final ⟨m⟩ occurred before another nasal in the next word, however, it was pronounced as a nasal at the place of articulation of the following consonant. For instance, tan dūrum [tan ˈduː.rũː] was written for tam dūrum in inscriptions, and cum nōbīs [kʊn ˈnoː.biːs] was a double entendre, presumably for cunnō bis [ˈkʊnnoː bɪs]. Likewise, before a labial consonant in the next word, it was pronounced as a bilabial nasal (/m/); and before a velar consonant, it was pronounced as a velar nasal (/ŋ/).

==== Diphthongs ====
Diphthongs classified by beginning sound
	Front	Back
Close		ui ui̯
Mid	ei ei̯ eu eu̯	oe oe̯ ~ eː
Open	ae ae̯ ~ ɛː au au̯	

⟨ae⟩, ⟨oe⟩, ⟨au⟩, ⟨ei⟩ and ⟨eu⟩ could represent diphthongs: ⟨ae⟩ represented /ae̯/, ⟨oe⟩ represented /oe̯/, ⟨au⟩ represented /au̯/, ⟨ei⟩ represented /ei̯/, and ⟨eu⟩ represented /eu̯/. ⟨ui⟩ sometimes represented the diphthong /ui̯/, as in cui and huic. The diphthong ⟨ei⟩ had mostly changed to ⟨ī⟩ by the Classical epoch; ⟨ei⟩ remained only in a few words, such as the interjection hei.

If there is a tréma above the second vowel, both vowels are pronounced separately: ⟨aë⟩ [ä.ɛ], ⟨aü⟩ [a.ʊ], ⟨eü⟩ [e.ʊ] and ⟨oë⟩ [ɔ.ɛ]. However, disyllabic ⟨eu⟩ in morpheme borders is traditionally written without the tréma: meus [ˈme.ʊs] 'my'.

In Old Latin, ⟨ae⟩ and ⟨oe⟩ were written as ⟨ai⟩, ⟨oi⟩ and probably pronounced as [äi̯] and [oi̯], with a fully closed second element, similar to the final syllable in French travail. In the late Old Latin period, the last element of the diphthongs was lowered to [e], so that the diphthongs were pronounced [äe̯] and [oe̯] in Classical Latin. They were then monophthongized to [ɛː] and [eː] respectively, starting in rural areas at the end of the Republican period. (Note: The simplification was already common in rural speech as far back as the time of Varro (116 BC – 27 BC): cf. De lingua Latina, 5:97 (referred to in Smith 2004, p. 47).) The process, however, does not seem to have been completed before the 3rd century AD, and some scholars say that it may have been regular by the 5th century.

=== Vowel and consonant length ===
Vowel and consonant length were more significant and more clearly defined in Latin than in modern English. Length is the duration of time that a particular sound is held before proceeding to the next sound in a word. In the modern spelling of Latin, especially in dictionaries and academic work, macrons are frequently used to mark long vowels: ⟨ā⟩, ⟨ē⟩, ⟨ī⟩, ⟨ō⟩, ⟨ū⟩ and ⟨ȳ⟩, while the breve is sometimes used to indicate that a vowel is short: ⟨ă⟩, ⟨ĕ⟩, ⟨ĭ⟩, ⟨ŏ⟩, ⟨ŭ⟩ and ⟨y̆⟩.

Long consonants were usually indicated through doubling, but ancient Latin orthography did not distinguish between the vocalic and consonantal uses of ⟨i⟩ and ⟨v⟩. Vowel length was indicated only intermittently in classical sources and even then through a variety of means. Later medieval and modern usage tended to omit vowel length altogether. A short-lived convention of spelling long vowels by doubling the vowel letter is associated with the poet Lucius Accius. Later spelling conventions marked long vowels with an apex (a diacritic similar to an acute accent) or, in the case of long i, by increasing the height of the letter; in the second century AD, those were given apices as well. The Classical vowel length system faded in later Latin and ceased to be phonemic in Romance, having been replaced by contrasts in vowel quality. Consonant length, however, remains contrastive in much of Italo-Romance, cf. Italian nono "ninth" versus nonno "grandfather".

Recording of ānus, annus, anus

A minimal set showing both long and short vowels and long and short consonants is ānus /ˈaː.nus/ ('anus'), annus /ˈan.nus/ ('year'), anus /ˈa.nus/ ('old woman').

=== Table of orthography ===
The letters ⟨b⟩, ⟨d⟩, ⟨f⟩, ⟨h⟩, ⟨m⟩, ⟨n⟩ are always pronounced as in English [b], [d], [f], [h], [m], [n] respectively, and they do not usually cause any difficulties. The exceptions are mentioned below:

Pronunciation of Latin consonants
Latin grapheme	Latin phoneme	English approximation
⟨C⟩, ⟨K⟩	[k]	Always hard as k in sky, never soft as in cellar, cello, or social. ⟨k⟩ is a letter coming from Greek, but seldom used and generally replaced by ⟨c⟩.
⟨CH⟩	[kʰ]	As ch in chemistry, and aspirated; never as in challenge or change and also never as in Bach or chutzpah. Transliteration of Greek ⟨χ⟩, mostly used in Greek loanwords.
⟨G⟩	[ɡ]	Always hard as g in good, never soft as g in gem.
⟨GN⟩	[ɡn ~ ŋn]	As ngn in wingnut.
⟨I⟩	[j]	At the beginning of a syllable before vowels, as y in yard, never as j in just.
⟨I⟩	[jː]	Geminated between vowels, as y y in toy yacht.
⟨L⟩	[l]	When doubled ⟨ll⟩ or before ⟨i⟩, as clear l in link (known as L exilis).
⟨L⟩	[ɫ]	In all other positions, as dark l in bowl (known as L pinguis).
⟨P⟩	[p]	As p in spy, unaspirated.
⟨PH⟩	[pʰ]	As p in party, always aspirated; never as in photo when being pronounced in English. Transliteration of Greek ⟨φ⟩, mostly used in Greek loanwords.
⟨QV⟩	[kʷ]	Similar to qu in quick, never as qu in antique. Before ⟨i⟩, like cu in French cuir.
⟨QVV⟩	[kʷɔ ~ kʷu ~ ku]	There were two trends: the educated and popular pronunciation. Within educated circles it was pronounced [kʷɔ], evoking the Old Latin pronunciation (equos, sequontur); meanwhile, within popular circles it was pronounced [ku] (ecus, secuntur).
⟨R⟩	[r]	As r in Italian and several Romance languages.
⟨RH⟩	[r̥]	As r in Italian and several Romance languages, but voiceless; e.g. diarrhoea ⟨διάῤῥοια⟩. (see Voiceless alveolar trill). Transcription of Greek ⟨ῥ⟩, mostly used in Greek loanwords.
⟨S⟩	[s]	As s in say, never as s in rise or measure.
⟨T⟩	[t]	As t in stay
⟨TH⟩	[tʰ]	As th in thyme, and aspirated; never as in thing, or that. Transliteration of Greek ⟨θ⟩, mostly used in Greek loanwords.
⟨V⟩	[w]	Sometimes at the beginning of a syllable, or after ⟨g⟩ and ⟨s⟩, as w in wine, never as v in vine.
⟨VV⟩	[wɔ ~ wu]	As one is pronounced in some English accents, but without the nasal sound: parvus [ˈpɐr.wɔs], vivunt [ˈwiː.wɔnt]. The spelling ⟨vu⟩ is post-classical, made in order to become regular in spelling.
⟨X⟩	[ks]	A letter representing ⟨c⟩ + ⟨s⟩, as well as ⟨g⟩ + ⟨s⟩: as x in English axe.
⟨Z⟩	[d͡z ~ zː]	As in zoom, never as in pizza. Transliteration of Greek ⟨ζ⟩, mostly used in Greek loanwords.

Pronunciation of Latin vowels
Latin grapheme	Latin phone	English approximation
⟨A⟩	[ä]	Similar to u in cut when short. Transliteration of Greek short ⟨α⟩.
⟨A⟩	[äː]	Similar to a in father when long. Transliteration of Greek long ⟨α⟩.
⟨E⟩	[ɛ]	As e in pet when short. Transliteration of Greek ⟨ε⟩.
⟨E⟩	[eː]	Similar to ey in they when long. Transliteration of Greek ⟨η⟩, and ⟨ει⟩ in some cases.
⟨I⟩	[ɪ]	As i in sit when short. Transliteration of short Greek ⟨ι⟩.
⟨I⟩	[iː]	Similar to i in machine when long. Transliteration of Greek long ⟨ι⟩, and ⟨ει⟩ in some cases.
⟨O⟩	[ɔ]	As o in sort when short. Transliteration of Greek ⟨ο⟩.
⟨O⟩	[oː]	Similar to o in holy when long. Transliteration of Greek ⟨ω⟩, and ⟨ου⟩ in some cases.
⟨V⟩	[ʊ]	Similar to u in put when short.
⟨V⟩	[uː]	Similar to u in true when long. Transliteration of Greek ⟨ου⟩.
⟨Y⟩	[ʏ]	As in German Stück when short (or as short u or i) (mostly used in Greek loanwords). Transliteration of Greek short ⟨υ⟩.
⟨Y⟩	[yː]	As in German früh when long (or as long u or i) (mostly used in Greek loanwords). Transliteration of Greek long ⟨υ⟩.

Pronunciation of Latin diphthongs
Latin grapheme	Latin phone	English approximation
⟨AE⟩	[ae̯]	As in aisle. Transliteration of Greek ⟨αι⟩.
⟨AV⟩	[au̯]	As in out. Transliteration of Greek ⟨αυ⟩.
⟨EI⟩	[ei̯]	As in ey in they. Transliteration of Greek ⟨ει⟩ in some cases.
⟨EV⟩	[eu̯]	As in Portuguese eu, similar to the British pronunciation of ow in low. Transliteration of Greek ⟨ευ⟩.
⟨OE⟩	[oe̯]	As in boy. Transliteration of Greek ⟨οι⟩.
⟨VI⟩	[ui̯]	As in Spanish muy, similar to hooey.
⟨YI⟩	[ʏɪ̯]	Transliteration of the Greek diphthong ⟨υι⟩.

== Syllables and stress ==
=== Nature of the accent ===
Although some French and Italian scholars believe that the classical Latin accent was purely a pitch accent, which had no effect on the placing of words in a line of poetry, the view of most scholars is that the accent was a stress accent. One argument for this is that unlike most languages with tonal accents, there are no minimal pairs like ancient Greek φῶς (falling accent) "light" vs. φώς (rising accent) "man" where a change of accent on the same syllable changes the meaning. Among other arguments are the loss of vowels before or after the accent in words such as discip(u)līna and sinist(e)ra; and the shortening of post or pre-accentual syllables in Plautus and Terence by brevis brevians, for example, scansions such as senex and voluptātem with the second syllable short.

=== Old Latin stress ===
In Old Latin, as in Proto-Italic, stress normally fell on the first syllable of a word. During this period, the word-initial stress triggered changes in the vowels of non-initial syllables, the effects of which are still visible in classical Latin. Compare for example:

- f**a**ciō 'I do/make', f**a**ctus 'made'; pronounced /ˈfa.ki.oː/ and /ˈfak.tus/ in later Old Latin and Classical Latin.
- aff**i**ciō 'I affect', aff**e**ctus 'affected'; pronounced /ˈaf.fi.ki.oː/ and /ˈaf.fek.tus/ in Old Latin following vowel reduction, /af.ˈfi.ki.oː/ and /af.ˈfek.tus/ in Classical Latin.

In the earliest Latin writings, the original unreduced vowels are still visible. Study of this vowel reduction, as well as syncopation (dropping of short unaccented syllables) in Greek loan words, indicates that the stress remained word-initial until around the time of Plautus, in the 3rd century BC. The placement of the stress then shifted to become the pattern found in classical Latin.

=== Classical Latin syllables and stress ===
In Classical Latin, stress fell on one of the last three syllables: the antepenult, the penult, and the ultimate (antepaenultima 'before almost last', paenultima 'almost last', and ultima syllaba 'last syllable'). Its position is determined by the syllable weight of the penult. If the penult is heavy, it is accented; if the penult is light and there are more than two syllables, the antepenult is accented. In a few words originally accented on the penult, accent is on the ultimate because the two last syllables have been contracted, or the last syllable has been lost.

==== Syllable ====
To determine stress, syllable weight of the penult must be determined. To determine syllable weight, words must be broken up into syllables. In the following examples, syllable structure is represented using these symbols: C (a consonant), K (a stop), R (a liquid), and V (a short vowel), VV (a long vowel or diphthong).

==== Nucleus ====
Every short vowel, long vowel, or diphthong belongs to a single syllable. This vowel forms the syllable nucleus. Thus magistrārum has four syllables, one for every vowel (a i ā u: V V VV V), aereus has three (ae e u: VV V V), tuō has two (u ō: V VV), and cui has one (ui: VV).

==== Onset and coda ====
A consonant before a vowel or a consonant cluster at the beginning of a word is placed in the same syllable as the following vowel. This consonant or consonant cluster forms the syllable onset.

- fēminae /feː.mi.nae̯/ (CVV.CV.CVV)
- uidēre /wi.deː.re/ (CV.CVV.CV)
- puerō /pu.e.roː/ (CV.V.CVV)
- beātae /be.aː.tae̯/ (CV.VV.CVV)
- grauiter /ɡra.wi.ter/ (CCV.CV.CVC)
- strātum /straː.tum/ (CCCVV.CVC)

After this, if there is an additional consonant inside the word, it is placed at the end of the syllable. This consonant is the syllable coda. Thus if a consonant cluster of two consonants occurs between vowels, they are broken up between syllables: one goes with the syllable before, the other with the syllable after.

- puella /pu.el.la/ (CV.VC.CV)
- supersum /su.per.sum/ (CV.CVC.CVC)
- coāctus /ko.aːk.tus/ (CV.VVC.CVC)
- intellēxit /in.tel.leːk.sit/ (VC.CVC.CVVC.CVC)

There are two exceptions. A consonant cluster of a stop /p/, /t/, /k/, /b/, /d/, or /g/ followed by a liquid /l/ or /r/ between vowels usually goes to the syllable after it, although it is also sometimes broken up like other consonant clusters.

- uolucris /wo.lu.kris/ or /wo.luk.ris/ (CV.CV.KRVC or CV.CVK.RVC)

==== Heavy and light syllables ====
As shown in the examples above, Latin syllables have a variety of possible structures. Here are some of them. The first four examples are light syllables, and the last six are heavy. All syllables have at least one V (vowel). A syllable is heavy if it has another V or C (or both) after the first V. In the table below, the extra V or VC is bolded, indicating that it makes the syllable heavy.

V
C	V
C	C	V
C	C	C	V
C	V	V
C	V	C
C	V	V	C
V	V
V	C
V	V	C

Thus, a syllable is heavy if it ends in a long vowel, a diphthong, or a consonant.

The syllable onset has no relationship to syllable weight; both heavy and light syllables can have no onset or an onset of one, two, or three consonants.

In Latin a syllable that is heavy because it ends in a long vowel or diphthong is traditionally called syllaba nātūrā longa (lit. transl. syllable long by nature), and a syllable that is heavy because it ends in a consonant is called positiōne longa (lit. transl. long by position). These terms are translations of Greek συλλαβὴ μακρά φύσει (syllabḕ makrá phýsei) and μακρὰ θέσει (makrà thései), respectively; therefore positiōne should not be mistaken for implying a syllable "is long because of its position/place in a word" but rather "is treated as 'long' by convention". This article uses the words heavy and light for syllables, and long and short for vowels since the two are not the same.

==== Stress rule ====
In a word of three or more syllables, the weight of the penult determines where the accent is placed. If the penult is light, accent is placed on the antepenult; if it is heavy, accent is placed on the penult. Below, stress is marked by placing the stress mark ⟨ˈ⟩ before the stressed syllable.

Words with stress on antepenult
volucris	fēminae	puerō
/ˈwo.lu.kris/	/ˈfeː.mi.nae̯/	/ˈpu.e.roː/
CV.CV.CCVC	CVV.CV.CVV	CV.V.CVV

Words with stress on penult
volucris	vidēre	intellēxit	beātae	puella	coāctus
CV.CVC.CVC	CV.CVV.CV	VC.CVC.CVVC.CVC	CV.VV.CVV	CV.VC.CV	CV.VVC.CVC
/woˈluk.ris/	/wiˈdeː.re/	/in.telˈleːk.sit/	/beˈaː.tae̯/	/puˈel.la/	/koˈaːk.tus/

==== Iambic shortening ====
Iambic shortening or brevis brevians is vowel shortening that occurs in words of the type light–heavy, where the light syllable is stressed. By this sound change, words like egō, modō, benē, amā with long final vowel change to ego, modo, bene, ama with short final vowel. This was a tendency that was apparently more common in colloquial speech.

The term also refers to shortening of closed syllables following a short syllable, for example quid ĕst, volŭptātem, apŭd iudicem and so on. This type of shortening is found in early Latin, for example in the comedies of Plautus and Terence, but not in poetry of the classical period.

== Elision ==
Where one word ended with a vowel (including the nasalized vowels written ⟨am⟩, ⟨em⟩, ⟨im⟩, ⟨om⟩ and ⟨um⟩, and the diphthong ⟨ae⟩) and the next word began with a vowel, the former vowel, at least in verse, was regularly elided; that is, it was omitted altogether, or possibly (in the case of /i/ and /u/) pronounced like the corresponding semivowel. When the second word was est or es, a different form of elision sometimes occurred (prodelision): the vowel of the preceding word was retained, and the ⟨e⟩ was elided instead. Elision also occurred in Ancient Greek, but in that language, it is shown in writing by the vowel in question being replaced by an apostrophe, whereas in Latin elision is not indicated at all in the orthography, but can be deduced from the verse form. Only occasionally is it found in inscriptions, as in scriptust for scriptum est.

== Modern conventions ==
=== Spelling ===
==== Letters ====
Modern usage, even for classical Latin texts, varies in respect of ⟨I⟩ and ⟨V⟩. During the Renaissance, the printing convention was to use ⟨I⟩ (upper case) and ⟨i⟩ (lower case) for both vocalic /i/ and consonantal /j/, to use ⟨V⟩ in the upper case and in the lower case to use ⟨v⟩ at the start of words and ⟨u⟩ subsequently within the word regardless of whether /u/ and /w/ was represented.

Many publishers (such as Oxford University Press) have adopted the convention of using ⟨I⟩ (upper case) and ⟨i⟩ (lower case) for both /i/ and /j/, and ⟨V⟩ (upper case) and ⟨u⟩ (lower case) for both /u/ and /w/.

An alternative approach, less common today, is to use ⟨i⟩ and ⟨u⟩ only for the vowels, and ⟨j⟩ and ⟨v⟩ for the approximants.

Most modern editions, however, adopt an intermediate position, distinguishing between ⟨u⟩ and ⟨v⟩, but not between ⟨i⟩ and ⟨j⟩. Usually, a non-vocalic ⟨v⟩ after ⟨q⟩, ⟨g⟩ or ⟨s⟩ is still printed as ⟨u⟩ rather than ⟨v⟩, likely because these did not change from /w/ to /v/ post-classically. (Note: This approach is also recommended in the help page for the Latin Wikipedia.)

==== Diacritics ====
Textbooks and dictionaries usually indicate the length of vowels by putting a macron above the long vowel (less frequently, the breve is also used to mark short vowels), but it is not generally done in regular texts. Occasionally, mainly in early printed texts up to the 18th century, one may see a circumflex used to indicate a long vowel where this makes a difference to the sense, for instance, Româ /ˈroːmaː/ ('from Rome' ablative) compared to Roma /ˈroːma/ ('Rome' nominative).

Sometimes, for instance in Roman Catholic service books, an acute accent over a vowel is used to indicate the stressed syllable. It would be redundant for one who knew the classical rules of accentuation and made the correct distinction between long and short vowels, but most Latin speakers since the 3rd century have not made any distinction between long and short vowels, but they have kept the accents in the same places; thus, the use of accent marks allows speakers to stress the word correctly even if they have never heard it spoken aloud.

=== Pronunciation ===
==== Post-Medieval Latin ====
Since around the beginning of the Renaissance period onwards, with the language being used as an international language among intellectuals, pronunciation of Latin in Europe came to be dominated by the phonology of local languages, resulting in a variety of different pronunciation systems. See the article Latin regional pronunciation for more details on those (with the exception of the Italian one, which is described in the section on Ecclesiastical pronunciation below).

==== Loan words and formal study ====
When Latin words are used as loanwords in a modern language, there is ordinarily little or no attempt to pronounce them as the Romans did; in most cases, a pronunciation suiting the phonology of the receiving language is employed.

Latin words in common use in English are generally fully assimilated into the English sound system, with little to mark them as foreign; for example, cranium, saliva. Other words have a stronger Latin feel to them, usually because of spelling features such as the digraphs ⟨ae⟩ and ⟨oe⟩ (occasionally written with the ligatures: ⟨æ⟩ and ⟨œ⟩, respectively), which both denote /iː/ in English. The digraph ⟨ae⟩ or ligature ⟨æ⟩ in some words tend to be given an /aɪ/ pronunciation; for example, curriculum vitae.

However, using loanwords in the context of the language borrowing them is a markedly different situation from the study of Latin itself. In this classroom setting, instructors and students attempt to recreate at least some sense of the original pronunciation. What is taught to native anglophones is suggested by the sounds of today's Romance languages, the direct descendants of Latin. Instructors who take this approach rationalize that Romance vowels probably come closer to the original pronunciation than those of any other modern language (see also the section § Pronunciation shared by Vulgar Latin and Romance languages below).

However, other languages—including Romance family members—all have their own interpretations of the Latin phonological system, applied both to loan words and formal study of Latin. But English, Romance, or other teachers do not always point out that the particular accent their students learn is not actually the way ancient Romans spoke.

==== Ecclesiastical pronunciation (Italian pronunciation) ====
Since the late 19th and early 20th centuries, an Italianate pronunciation of Latin has grown to be accepted as a universal standard in the Catholic Church. Before then, the pronunciation of Latin in church was the same as the pronunciation of Latin in other fields and tended to reflect the sound values associated with the nationality and native language of the speaker. Other ecclesiastical pronunciations are still in use, especially outside the Catholic Church. The impetus for the adoption of Italianate pronunciation as an international standard of the Catholic Church came with the First Vatican Council of 1869–1870 and especially with the efforts of Pope Pius X (1903–1914), who addressed the subject in a Motu proprio about sacred music in 1903 and in a letter he sent to the Archbishop of Bourges in 1912.

A guide to this Italianate pronunciation is provided below. Since the letters or letter-combinations ⟨b⟩, ⟨d⟩, ⟨f⟩, ⟨m⟩, ⟨n⟩, and ⟨v⟩ are pronounced as they are in English, they are not included in the table.

Consonants
Grapheme	Pronunciation	Context	Example	English approximation
⟨c⟩	[t͡ʃ]	Before ⟨ae⟩, ⟨e⟩, ⟨i⟩, ⟨oe⟩, ⟨y⟩	procella	change
⟨c⟩	[k]	Before ⟨a⟩, ⟨o⟩, ⟨u⟩	carnem	sky (never aspirated as in kill)
⟨ch⟩	[k]	Always	Antiochia	sky (never aspirated as in kill)
⟨g⟩	[d͡ʒ]	Before ⟨ae⟩, ⟨e⟩, ⟨i⟩, ⟨oe⟩, ⟨y⟩	agere	gem
⟨g⟩	[ɡ]	Before ⟨a⟩, ⟨o⟩, ⟨u⟩	plaga	gate
⟨gn⟩	[ɲ]	Beginning of a word or after a consonant	gnatus	canyon (roughly); precisely Italian gnocchi
⟨gn⟩	[ɲː]	Between vowels	signum	Doubled, as in long gnocchi
⟨gu⟩	[ɡʷ]	Between ⟨n⟩ and vowels	lingua	linguistics (never as in guide)
⟨h⟩	∅	In nearly all cases	hora	(silent)
⟨h⟩	[k]	Between vowels in a few words	mihi	sky (never aspirated as in kill)
⟨i⟩	[j]	Beginning of a word and before a vowel	ianua	yard
⟨i⟩	[jː]	Between vowels	Gaius	Doubled, as in toy yacht
⟨k⟩	[k]	Always	Karthago	sky (never aspirated as in kill)
⟨l⟩	[l]	Always	paulum	slip (never 'dark' as in pools)
⟨p⟩	[p]	Always	praeda	spy (never aspirated as in pill)
⟨ph⟩	[f]	Always	Christophorus	feminine
⟨qu⟩	[kʷ]	Always	atque	quick (never as in antique)
⟨r⟩	[r]	Always	regina	(rolled like Italian or Spanish rana)
⟨rh⟩	[r]	Always	rhythmus	(rolled like Italian or Spanish rana)
⟨rr⟩	[rː]	Always	terra	Same as above, but long
⟨rrh⟩	[rː]	Always	haemorrhagia	Same as above, but long
⟨ss⟩	[sː]	Always	esse	Doubled, as in as songs
⟨s⟩	[s]	Always (formally)	sanctum	sing
⟨s⟩	[z]	Between vowels (informally)	miser	tease
⟨sc⟩	[ʃ]	Before ⟨ae⟩, ⟨e⟩, ⟨i⟩, ⟨oe⟩, ⟨y⟩; at the beginning of a word or after a consonant	scio	shade
⟨sc⟩	[ʃː]	Same as above, but intervocalic	ascendit	Doubled, as in ash shadow
⟨sc⟩	[sk]	Before ⟨a⟩, ⟨o⟩, ⟨u⟩	pascunt	scare
⟨su⟩	[sʷ]	In a few words (poetic)	suavis	Swiss
⟨su⟩	[su]	Always (non poetic)	suus	Superman
⟨t⟩	[t͡s]	Before unstressed ⟨i⟩ and not after ⟨s⟩, ⟨t⟩, ⟨x⟩; at the beginning of a word or after a consonant	silentium	pizza
⟨t⟩	[t͡ːs]	Same as above, but intervocalic	nationem	Doubled, as in at tsunami
⟨t⟩	[t]	Generally	tironibus	stay (never aspirated as in table nor soft as in nation)
⟨th⟩	[t]	Always	theca	stay (never aspirated as in table nor soft as in nation)
⟨v⟩	[v]	Always	conservare	preserve
⟨w⟩	[w]	Always	wardo	way
⟨uw⟩	[u̯ː]	Always	heu wardam	Doubled, as in saw way
⟨x⟩	[ɡz]	Word internally before a stressed vowel	exaudi	examine
⟨x⟩	[ks]	Generally	dextro	fox
⟨xc⟩	[ksk]	Generally	exclamavit	exclaim
⟨xc⟩	[kʃ]	Before ⟨ae⟩, ⟨e⟩, ⟨i⟩, ⟨oe⟩, ⟨y⟩	excelsis	thick shell
⟨xs⟩	[ksː]	Always	exstans	Doubled, as in ex-sacristan
⟨xsc⟩	[ksːk]	Generally	exsculpo	Doubled, as in ex-skatist
⟨xsc⟩	[kʃː]	Before ⟨ae⟩, ⟨e⟩, ⟨i⟩, ⟨oe⟩, ⟨y⟩	exscindo	Doubled, as in ex-shaman
⟨z⟩	[d͡z]	Beginning of a word or after a consonant	zona	lads
⟨z⟩	[d͡ːz]	Intervocalic	Horomazes	Doubled, as in linked dzungar

Vowels
Grapheme	Pronunciation	English approximation
⟨a⟩	[ä]	father (roughly) precisely Spanish ramo
⟨ae⟩	[ɛ]/[e]	pet
⟨oe⟩	[ɛ]/[e]	pet
⟨e⟩	[ɛ]/[e]	pet
⟨i⟩	[i]	seek (roughly) precisely Spanish ir
⟨y⟩	[i]	seek (roughly) precisely Spanish ir
⟨o⟩	[ɔ]/[o]	sort
⟨u⟩	[u]	cool (roughly) precisely Spanish uno

Diphthongs
Grapheme	Pronunciation	English approximation
⟨au⟩	[au̯]	out
⟨ay⟩	[ai̯]	buy
⟨ei⟩	[ɛi̯]	they
⟨eu⟩	[ɛu̯]	hello as pronounced by Elmer Fudd: hewwo
⟨ui⟩	[ui̯]	Gruyère

- Vowel length is not phonemic. As a result, the automatic stress accent of Classical Latin, which was dependent on vowel length, becomes a phonemic one in Ecclesiastical Latin. (Some Ecclesiastical texts mark the stress with an acute accent in words of three or more syllables.)
- Word-final ⟨m⟩ and ⟨n⟩ are pronounced fully, with no nasalization of the preceding vowel.

In his Vox Latina: A guide to the Pronunciation of Classical Latin, William Sidney Allen remarked that this pronunciation, used by the Catholic Church in Rome and elsewhere, was recommended by Pope Pius X in a 1912 letter to the Archbishop of Bourges. However, as can be seen from the table above, there are very significant differences. The introduction to the Liber Usualis indicates that Ecclesiastical Latin pronunciation should be used at Church liturgies. The Pontifical Academy for Latin is the pontifical academy in the Vatican that is charged with the dissemination and education of Catholics in the Latin language.

Outside of Austria, Germany, Poland, Hungary, Czechia and Slovakia, it is the most widely used standard in choral singing which, with a few exceptions like Stravinsky's Oedipus rex, is concerned with liturgical texts. Anglican choirs adopted it when classicists abandoned traditional English pronunciation after World War II. The rise of historically informed performance and the availability of guides such as Copeman's Singing in Latin has led to the recent revival of regional pronunciations.

== Pronunciation shared by Vulgar Latin and Romance languages ==
As Classical Latin developed to Late Latin, and eventually into the modern Romance languages, it experienced several phonological changes. Notable changes include the following (the precise order of which is uncertain):

- Loss of /h/, in all contexts, and loss of final /m/, in polysyllabic words.
- Monophthongization of /ae̯ oe̯/ to /ɛː eː/ respectively.
- Fortition of /w/ to /β/, then lenition of intervocalic /b/ to /β/. (Later developing to /v/ in many areas.)
- Phonemic (no longer allophonic) loss of /n/ before /s/ and of final in polysyllabic words.
- Phonemic (no longer allophonic) development of /i e/ to /j/ when unstressed and in hiatus.
- Palatalization of the consonants /t d/ by a following /j/.
- Loss of phonemic vowel length, with vowel quality becoming the distinctive factor instead. A number of vowel mergers followed as a result.
- Palatalization of various other consonants by a following /j/.
- Palatalization of /k ɡ/ before front vowels (not everywhere).

== Examples ==
The following examples are both in verse, which demonstrates several features more clearly than prose.

=== From Classical Latin ===
Virgil's Aeneid, Book 1, verses 1–4. Quintilian describes the pronunciation of this passage in depth in Book XI of the Institutio Oratoria.

Quantitative metre (dactylic hexameter). Translation: "I sing of arms and the man, who, driven by fate, came first from the borders of Troy to Italy and the Lavinian shores; he [was] much afflicted both on lands and on the deep by the power of the gods, because of fierce Juno's vindictive wrath."

Recording of first four lines of the Aeneid in reconstructed Classical Latin pronunciation

1. Traditional (19th-century) English orthography
  Arma virúmque cano, Trojæ qui primus ab oris
  Italiam, fato profugus, Lavíniaque venit
  Litora; multùm ille et terris jactatus et alto
  Vi superum, sævæ memorem Junonis ob iram.
2. Modern orthography with macrons
  Arma virumque canō, Troiae quī prīmus ab ōrīs
  Ītaliam, fātō profugus, Lāvīniaque vēnit
  Lītora; multum ille et terrīs iactātus et altō
  Vī superum, saevae memorem Iūnōnis ob īram.
3. Modern orthography with macrons and without u and v distinction (capital u written V)
  Arma uirumque canō, Troiae quī prīmus ab ōrīs
  Ītaliam, fātō profugus, Lāuīniaque uēnit
  Lītora; multum ille et terrīs iactātus et altō
  Vī superum, saeuae memorem Iūnōnis ob īram.
4. Modern orthography without macrons
  Arma virumque cano, Troiae qui primus ab oris
  Italiam, fato profugus, Laviniaque venit
  Litora; multum ille et terris iactatus et alto
  Vi superum, saevae memorem Iunonis ob iram.
5. [Reconstructed] Classical Roman pronunciation
  [ˈar.ma wiˈruŋ.kʷɛ ˈka.nɔː | ˈtrɔj.jae̯ kʷiː ˈpriː.mus̠ aˈb‿ɔː.riːs̠
  iːˈt̪a.li.ãː | ˈfaː.t̪ɔː ˈprɔ.fu.ɡus̠ | laː.wiːˈni.a.kʷɛ ˈwɛː.nit̪
  ˈliː.t̪ɔ.ra ‖ ˈmulˈt̪(ʷ)‿il.l‿ɛt̪ ˈt̪ɛr.riːs̠ jakˈt̪aː.t̪us̠ ɛˈt̪‿al.t̪ɔː
  wiː ˈs̠u.pæ.rũː | ˈs̠ae̯.wae̯ ˈmɛ.mɔ.rẽː juːˈnɔː.nis̠ ɔˈb‿iː.rãː]

Note the elisions in mult(um) and ill(e) in the third line. For a fuller discussion of the prosodic features of this passage, see Dactylic hexameter.

Some manuscripts have "Lāvīna" rather than "Lāvīnia" in the second line.

=== From Medieval Latin ===
Beginning of Pange Lingua Gloriosi Corporis Mysterium by Thomas Aquinas (13th century). Rhymed accentual metre. Translation: "Extol, [my] tongue, the mystery of the glorious body and the precious blood, which the fruit of a noble womb, the king of nations, poured out as the price of the world."

1. Traditional orthography as in Roman Catholic service books (stressed syllable marked with an acute accent on words of three syllables or more).
  Pange lingua gloriósi
  Córporis mystérium,
  Sanguinísque pretiósi,
  quem in mundi prétium
  fructus ventris generósi
  Rex effúdit géntium.
2. Italianate ecclesiastical pronunciation:
  [ˈpän̠ʲd͡ʒe ˈl̺iŋɡwä ɡl̺oɾiˈɔːsi
  ˈkɔrpoɾis misˈt̪eːɾium
  säŋɡwiˈn̺iskwe pɾet̪t̪͡s̪i'ɔːsi
  kwɛm in̺ ˈmun̪d̪i ˈpɾɛt̪ː͡s̪ium
  ˈfɾukt̪us ˈvɛn̪t̪ɾis d͡ʒen̺eˈɾɔːsi
  ˈɾɛks efˈfuːd̪it̪ ˈd͡ʒen̪t̪͡s̪ium]

== See also ==
- Latin alphabet
- Latin grammar
- Latin regional pronunciation
- Traditional English pronunciation of Latin
- Deutsche Aussprache des Lateinischen (in German) – traditional German pronunciation
- Schulaussprache des Lateinischen (in German) – revised "school" pronunciation
- Traditional French pronunciation (in French)

== Bibliography ==
- Alkire, Ti; Rosen, Carol (2010). Romance Languages: A Historical Introduction. Cambridge University Press. ISBN 978-0521889155.
- Allen, William Sidney (1978) [1965]. Vox Latina: A Guide to the Pronunciation of Classical Latin (PDF) (2nd ed.). Cambridge University Press. ISBN 0-521-37936-9.
- Allen, William Sidney (1987). Vox Graeca: The Pronunciation of Classical Greek. Cambridge University Press. ISBN 978-0521335553.
- Allen, Joseph A.; Greenough, James B. (2001) [1903]. Mahoney, Anne (ed.). New Latin Grammar for Schools and Colleges. Newburyport, Massachusetts: R. Pullins Company. ISBN 1-58510-042-0.
- Brittain, Frederick (1955). Latin in Church. The History of its Pronunciation (2nd ed.). Mowbray.
- Calabrese, Andrea (2005). "On the Feature [ATR] and the Evolution of the Short High Vowels of Latin into Romance" (PDF). University of Connecticut Working Papers in Linguistics. 13: 33–78. Archived from the original (PDF) on 13 November 2012.
- Leppänen, Ville; Alho, Tommi (2018). "On The Mergers Of Latin Close-Mid Vowels". Transactions of the Philological Society. 116 (3): 473–474. doi:10.1111/1467-968X.12130.
- Clackson, James; Horrocks, Geoffrey (2007). The Blackwell History of the Latin Language. Oxford, UK: Blackwell Publishing. ISBN 978-1-4051-6209-8.
- Clackson, James (2008). "Latin". In Roger D. Woodard (ed.). The Ancient Languages of Europe. Cambridge University Press. ISBN 978-0-521-68495-8.
- Cser, András (2020). "The phonology of Classical Latin". Transactions of the Philological Society. 118. Publications of the Philological Society: 1–218. doi:10.1111/1467-968X.12184. S2CID 219404384.
- Fortson, Benjamin W. IV (2004). Indo-European Language and Culture: An Introduction. Wiley. ISBN 978-1-4051-0315-2.
- Gilbert, Allan H (June 1939). "Mock Accents in Renaissance and Modern Latin". Publications of the Modern Language Association of America. 54 (2): 608–610. doi:10.2307/458579. JSTOR 458579. S2CID 164184102.
- Hayes, Bruce (1995). Metrical stress theory: principles and case studies. University of Chicago. ISBN 9780226321042.
- Leppänen, Ville; Alho, Tommi (November 2018). "On The Mergers Of Latin Close-Mid Vowels". Transactions of the Philological Society. 116 (3): 460–483. doi:10.1111/1467-968X.12130.
- Levy, Harry L. (1989). A Latin Reader for Colleges. University of Chicago Press.
- Lloyd, Paul M. (1987). From Latin to Spanish. Diane Publishing. ISBN 978-0-87169-173-6.
- Neidermann, Max (1945) [1906]. Précis de phonétique historique du latin (2 ed.). Paris.
- McCullagh, Matthew (2011). "The Sounds of Latin: Phonology". In James Clackson (ed.). A Companion to the Latin Language. Blackwell Publishing. ISBN 978-1405186056.
- Pekkanen, Tuomo (1999). Ars grammatica—Latinan kielioppi (in Finnish and Latin) (3rd-6th ed.). Helsinki: Helsinki University Press. ISBN 951-570-022-1.
- Pope Pius X (November 22, 1903). "Tra le Sollecitudini". Rome, Italy: Adoremus.
- Pope, M. K. (1952) [1934]. From Latin to Modern French with especial consideration of Anglo-Norman (revised ed.). Manchester: Manchester University Press.
- Sihler, Andrew L. (1995). New Comparative Grammar of Greek and Latin. Oxford: Oxford University Press. ISBN 0-19-508345-8.
- Smith, Jane Stuart (2004). Phonetics and Philology: Sound Change in Italic. Oxford University Press. ISBN 0-19-925773-6.
- Sturtevant, Edgar Howard (1920). The pronunciation of Greek and Latin. Chicago: University of Chicago Press.
- Ward, Ralf L. (June 1962). "Evidence For The Pronunciation Of Latin". The Classical World. 55 (9): 273–275. doi:10.2307/4344896. JSTOR 4344896.
- Wingo, E. Otha (1972). Latin Punctuation in the Classical Age. De Gruyter Mouton. ISBN 978-9027923233.
