= Claudian letters =

Three new letters of the Latin alphabet introduced by Roman Emperor Claudius

Claudian letters, with the variant of antisigma supported by manuscripts of Priscian.

Claudian letters with the Ↄ variant of antisigma.

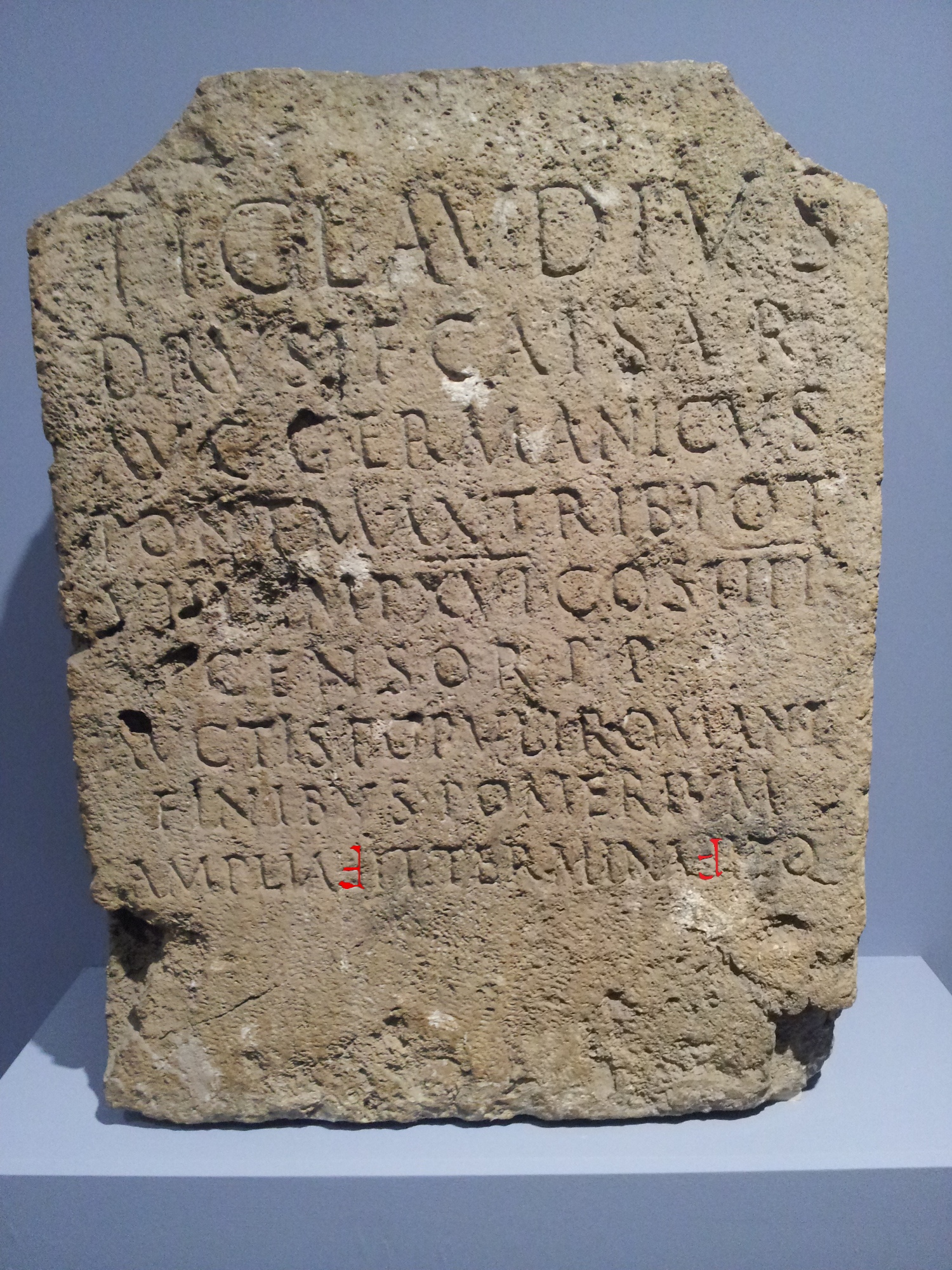
Claudian pomerium marker, where written words ampliavit and terminavit use turned digamma (highlighted in red)

The Claudian letters were a set of three new letters for the Latin alphabet developed by the Roman emperor Claudius, who reigned the Roman Empire from the year 41 to the year 54. These letters, according to the emperor, were much needed for the language, although they did not outlast his reign.

== Antisigma (Ↄ) ==
Ↄ or /X (antisigma) to replace BS [bz] and PS [ps], much as X stood in for CS [ks] and GS [ɡz]. The shape of this letter is disputed, however, since no inscription bearing it has been found. Franz Bücheler identified it with the variant Roman numeral Ↄ, but 20th-century philologists, working from copies of Priscian's books, believe it to instead resemble two linked Cs (Ↄ+Ϲ), which was a preexisting variant of Greek sigma, and easily mistaken for X by later writers. Revilo P. Oliver argued that Claudius would have based this letter upon the Arcadian variant of psi or.

As noted, no examples of this letter from the time have been discovered; its usage must be guessed at. It would probably replace the PS or BS sequence in Latin words, especially those with Greek etymology, such as DYSPEↃIA (dyspepsia), EPILEↃIA (epilepsia), ↃALMVS (psalmus), or VRↃ (urbs).

== Digamma inversum (Ⅎ) ==
Ⅎ, a turned F or digamma (digamma inversum) to be used instead of the letter V when denoting the consonantal phoneme [w] or [β]. Thus, it resembles the use of the letter V in modern Latin texts, where the vocalic use of the letter V is represented by its variant U, which has been recognized as a different letter only later.

Examples of Ⅎ: AMPLIAℲIT (ampliavit), ARℲALES (arvales), ARℲALIVM (arvalium), BOℲE (bove), IOℲI (Iovi), TERMINAℲITQVE (terminavitque), VOℲIMVS (vovimus), ℲELINA (Velina), ℲIR (vir), ℲOℲEMVS (vovemus).

== Half H (Ⱶ) ==
Ⱶ, a half H. The value of this letter is unclear, but it may have represented the so-called sonus medius, a short vowel sound, likely [ʉ], that was a conflation of short i and u, but it could have also been [ɨ]. It was used before labial consonants in Latin words such as optumus ~ optimus. However, this use is not attested in inscriptions, and it is possible that the passage in Velius on which this claim is based, is corrupt. The letter was later used as a variant of [y] in inscriptions for short Greek upsilon (as in Olympicus). It may have disappeared because the sonus medius itself disappeared from spoken language.Nikitina argues for the possibility that the letter is used to avoid confusion in spelling between i/y/u.

Examples of Ⱶ: BⱵBLIOTHECA (bibliotheca), CⱵCNVS (cycnus), MAXⱵMVS (maximus), OPTⱵME (optime), and once in GⱵBERNATOR (gubernator).

== Usage ==
These letters were used to a small extent on public inscriptions dating from Claudius' reign, but their use was abandoned after his death. Their forms were probably chosen to ease the transition, as they could be made from templates for existing letters. He may have been inspired by his ancestor Appius Claudius the Censor, who made earlier changes to the Latin alphabet. Claudius did indeed introduce his letters during his own term as censor (47–48), using arguments preserved in the historian Tacitus' account of his reign, although the original proclamation is no longer extant. Suetonius said of Claudius' letters:

Besides this he [Claudius] invented three new letters and added them to the alphabet, maintaining that they were greatly needed; he published a book on their theory when he was still in private life, and when he became emperor had no difficulty in bringing about their general use. These characters may still be seen in numerous books, in the [state] registers, and in inscriptions on public buildings.

Support for the letters was added in version 5.0.0 of Unicode. Although these letters, as all Latin letters in antiquity, originally occurred only in capital form, lowercase forms were introduced to meet Unicode casing requirements. The minuscule form for the turned F was designed as a turned small capital F and should not be confused with the IPA symbol ɟ representing a voiced palatal stop.

The letters are encoded as follows:

| Description | Letter | Unicode | HTML | Script |
|---|---|---|---|---|
| TURNED CAPITAL F TURNED SMALL F | Ⅎ ⅎ | U+2132; U+214E | &#8498; &#8526; | Latin |
| ROMAN NUMERAL REVERSED ONE HUNDRED; LATIN SMALL LETTER REVERSED C | Ↄ ↄ | U+2183; U+2184 | &#8579; &#8580; | Latin |
| LATIN CAPITAL LETTER HALF H LATIN SMALL LETTER HALF H | Ⱶ ⱶ | U+2C75; U+2C76 | &#11381; &#11382; | Latin |

== See also ==
- Chinese characters of Empress Wu
- Reversed half H – Letter of the Latin alphabet
