= Latin regional pronunciation =

Various systems of Latin pronunciation

Latin pronunciation, both in the classical and post-classical age, has varied across different regions and different eras. As the respective languages have undergone sound changes, the changes have often applied to the pronunciation of Latin as well.

Latin still in use today is more often pronounced according to context, rather than geography. Starting mainly from the first half of the 20th century, ecclesiastical Latin, that is Latin with an Italianate pronunciation, has been the official pronunciation of the Catholic Church due to the centrality of Italy and Italian, and this is the default of many singers and choirs. In the interest of historically informed performance, some singers of Medieval, Renaissance and Baroque music adopt the pronunciation of the composer's period and region. While in Western university classics departments, some form of a restored classical pronunciation has been general since around 1945, in the Anglo-American legal professions the older style of academic Latin still survives.

The following table shows the main differences between different regions with the International Phonetic Alphabet. This is far from a complete listing and lacks the local variations exhibited through centuries, but is intended to give an outline of main characteristics of different regions.

Sign	Example	Classical	Italian	Romanian	Spanish	Portuguese	French	Catalan	Russian	Polish	Croatian and Serbian	Czech	German/Uralic	Danish	English (Note: Vowel length in the traditional English pronunciation of Latin is not determined from classical vowel length, but from syllabification and stress.)	Greek
a	canis	/a/	/a/						/a/	/a/	/a/	/a/	/a(ː)/	/æ(ː)/ (/a(ː)/)	/æ/ or /eɪ/	/a/
ā	cāsus	/aː/	/a/						/a/	/a/	/a/	/aː/	/a(ː)/	/æ(ː)/ (/a(ː)/)	/æ/ or /eɪ/	/a/
ae (æ)	saepe, bonae	/aɪ, ae/, later /ɛː/	/ɛ/	/e/		/ɛ/		/ɛ/ (/e/ when unstressed)	/e/	/ɛ/	/e/	/ɛː/	/ɛː/		/ɛ/ or /iː/	/e/
c^{e,i,ae,oe}	benedīcimus	/k/	/tʃ/ (Note: In 17th century Venice, soft c was /ts/: cf. Monteverdi's motet Venite sicientes ad aquas (for the usual spelling sitientes))		/θ/ or /s/	/s/			/t͡s/	/t͡s/	/t͡s/	/t͡s/	/ts/	/s/		/k/ or /c/^{e,i}
ch	pulcher	/kʰ/	/k/						/x/	/x/	/x/	/x/	/x/ or /ç/	/k(ʰ)/	/k/	/x/ or /ç/^{e,i}
e	venī	/ɛ/		/e/		/ɛ/		/ɛ/ (/e/ when unstressed)	/e/	/ɛ/	/e/	/ɛ/	/ɛ/ or /eː/	/ɛ/	/ɛ/ or /iː/	/e/
ē	vēnī	/eː/	/e/						/e/	/ɛ/	/e/	/ɛː/	/eː/		/ɛ/ or /iː/	/e/
g^{e,i,ae,oe}	agimus	/ɡ/	/dʒ/	/d͡ʒ/	/x/	/ʒ/			/ɡ/	/ɡ/	/ɡ/	/ɡ/	/ɡ/		/dʒ/	/g/
gn	magnum	/ŋn/ or /gn/	/ɲɲ/	/ɡn/	/ɣn/	/ɲ/ or /ɡn/	/ɡn/		/ɡn/	/ɡn/	/ɡn/	/ɡn/	/ɡn/ or /ŋn/	/ŋn/	/ɡn/	
h	hominibus	/h, -/	/-/	/h/	/-/				/h/ (Note: Described thus: "h is pronounced as English [h] (in the word horse)." ("Буква h произносится как английское [h] в слове horse."))	/x/	/x/	/ɦ/	/h/			/x/ or /ç/^{e,i}
i	fides	/ɪ/	/i/						/i/ ([ɨ] after ⟨c⟩ /t͡s/)	/i/	/i/	/i/	/ɪ/ or /iː/	/i/	/ɪ/ or /aɪ/	/i/
ī	fīlius	/iː/	/i/						/i/ ([ɨ] after ⟨c⟩ /t͡s/)	/i/	/i/	/iː/	/ɪ/ or /iː/	/i/	/ɪ/ or /aɪ/	/i/
j	Jesus	/j/			/x/	/ʒ/			/j/	/j/	/j/	/j/	/j/		/dʒ/	/ʝ/
o	solum	/ɔ/		/o/		/ɔ/	/o(ː)/	/ɔ/ (/o/ when unstressed)	/o/	/ɔ/	/o/	/o/	/ɔ/ or /oː/	/ɔ/	/ɒ/ or /oʊ/	/o/
ō	sōlus	/oː/	/o/	/o/		/o/	/o(ː)/	/o/	/o/	/ɔ/	/o/	/oː/	/ɔ/ or /oː/	/oː/	/ɒ/ or /oʊ/	/o/
oe (œ)	poena	/ɔɪ, oe/, later /eː/	/e/						/ø/ (Note: Described thus: "oe is pronounced as German [ö] or French [eu] (in the word peur)" ("oe произносится как немецкое [ö] или французское [eu] (в слове peur)"))	/ɛ/	/e/	/ɛː/	/øː/, /e:/	/øː/	/ɛ/ or /iː/	/ø/, /e/
qu	quis	/kʷ/	/kw/	/kv/ or /kw/	/kw/ or /k/	/kʷ/	/kw/^{a} /kɥ/^{æ,e,i} /k/^{o,u}	/kw/^{a,o} /k/^{æ,e,i,u}	/kv/	/kf/	/kʋ/	/kv/	/kv/	/kʰv/	/kw/	/kv/
s^{ungeminated between vowels}	rosa	/s/	/s/ or /z/	/z/	/s/	/z/			/z/	/z/	/z/	/z/	/z/	/s/	/s/ or /z/	/z/
sc^{e,i,ae,oe}	ascendit	/sk/	/ʃː/	/st͡ʃ/	/sθ/ or /s/	/s/ or /ʃ/	/s/		/st͡s/	/st͡s/	/st͡s/	/st͡s/	/sts/	/s/		/sk/
ti^{V}	nātiō	/tɪ/	/tsj/	/t͡si/	/θj/ or /sj/	/sj/		/si/	/t͡si/ [t͡sɨ] (Note: But /ti/ (Russian /tʲi/): 1) in totīus, 2) after /s/ (including ⟨x⟩ /ks/) and /t/, 3) in Greek loanwords.)	/ti/, historically /t͡sj/	/t͡si/	/t͡si/	/tsi/ or /tsj/	/ʃ/	/ʃi/	/ti/
u	ut, sumus	/ʊ/	/u/				/y(ː)/	/u/	/u/	/u/	/u/	/u/	/ʊ/ or /uː/	/u(ː)/ (/o/)	/ʌ/ or /juː/	/u/
ū	lūna	/uː/	/u/				/y(ː)/	/u/	/u/	/u/	/u/	/uː/	/ʊ/ or /uː/	/u(ː)/ (/o/)	/ʌ/ or /juː/	/u/
um	curriculum	/ʊ̃/	/um/			/ũ/	/ɔm/	/um/	/um/	/um/	/um/	/um/	/ʊm/	/om/	/əm/	/um/
v	veritās	/w/, later /v/	/v/		/b/ or /β/	/v/			/v/	/v/	/ʋ/	/v/	/v/	/ʋ/	/v/	
xc^{e,i,ae,oe}	excelsis	/ksk/	/kʃ/ (Note: Due to xc appearing to be two separate consonants, some people eschew the standard pronunciation in favor of /kstʃ/, citation is needed for this pronunciation's authoritativeness.)	/kst͡ʃ/	/sθ/ or /s/	/ks/, /s/ or /ʃ/	/ɡz/ or /ks/	/ks/	/kst͡s/	/kst͡s/	/kst͡s/	/kst͡s/	/ksts/	/ks/		/ksk/
z	zodiacus	/dz/		/z/	/θ/ or /s/	/z/			/z/	/z/	/z/	/z/	/ts/	/s/	/z/	

In many countries, these regional varieties are still in general use in schools and churches. The Italian model is increasingly advocated in ecclesiastical contexts and now widely followed in such contexts by speakers of English, sometimes with slight variations. The Liber Usualis prescribes a silent "h", except in the two words "mihi" and "nihil", which are pronounced /miki/ and /nikil/ (this is not universally followed). Some Anglophone singers pronounce "h" as /h/.

== See also ==
- Traditional English pronunciation of Latin
- Traditional German and school German pronunciation of Latin (in German)
- Traditional French pronunciation of Latin (in German)
- Traditional Catalan pronunciation of Latin (in Catalan)

=== Other languages ===
- Pronunciation of Ancient Greek in teaching
- Sino-Xenic pronunciations
