= Long I =

Letter variant

Long i (Latin: i longum or [littera] i longa), written ⟨ꟾ⟩, is a variant of the letter i found in ancient and early medieval forms of the Latin script.

== History ==
In inscriptions dating to the early Roman Empire, it is used frequently but inconsistently to transcribe the long vowel /iː/. In Gordon's 1957 study of inscriptions, it represented this vowel approximately 4% of the time in the 1st century CE, then 22.6% in the 2nd century, 11% in the 3rd, and not at all from the 4th century onward, reflecting a loss of phonemic vowel length by this time (one of the phonological changes from Classical Latin to Proto-Romance). In this role it is equivalent to the (also inconsistently-used) apex, which can appear on any long vowel: ⟨á é í ó v́⟩ /aː eː iː oː uː/. An example would be ⟨fIliI⟩, which is generally spelled fīliī today, using macrons rather than apices to indicate long vowels. On rare occasions, an apex could combine with long i to form ⟨Í⟩, e.g. ⟨dÍs·mánibus⟩.

The long i could also be used to indicate the semivowel [j], e.g. ⟨IVSTVS⟩ or ⟨CVIIVS⟩, the latter also ⟨CVIVS⟩, pronounced [ˈjus̠tus̠, ˈkujːus̠]. It was also used to write a close allophone [i] of the short i phoneme, used before another vowel, as in ⟨CLAVDIO⟩, representing [ˈklau̯.di.oː].

Later on in the late Empire and afterwards, in some forms of New Roman cursive, as well as pre-Carolingian scripts of the Early Middle Ages such as Visigothic or Merovingian, it came to stand for the vowel ⟨i⟩ in word-initial position. For example, ⟨iNponunt in umeroſ⟩, which would be inpōnunt in umerōs in modern spelling.

== In Unicode ==
The character exists in Unicode as U+A7FE latin epigraphic letter i longa, ⟨ꟾ⟩, having been suggested in a 2006 proposal.

== Examples ==
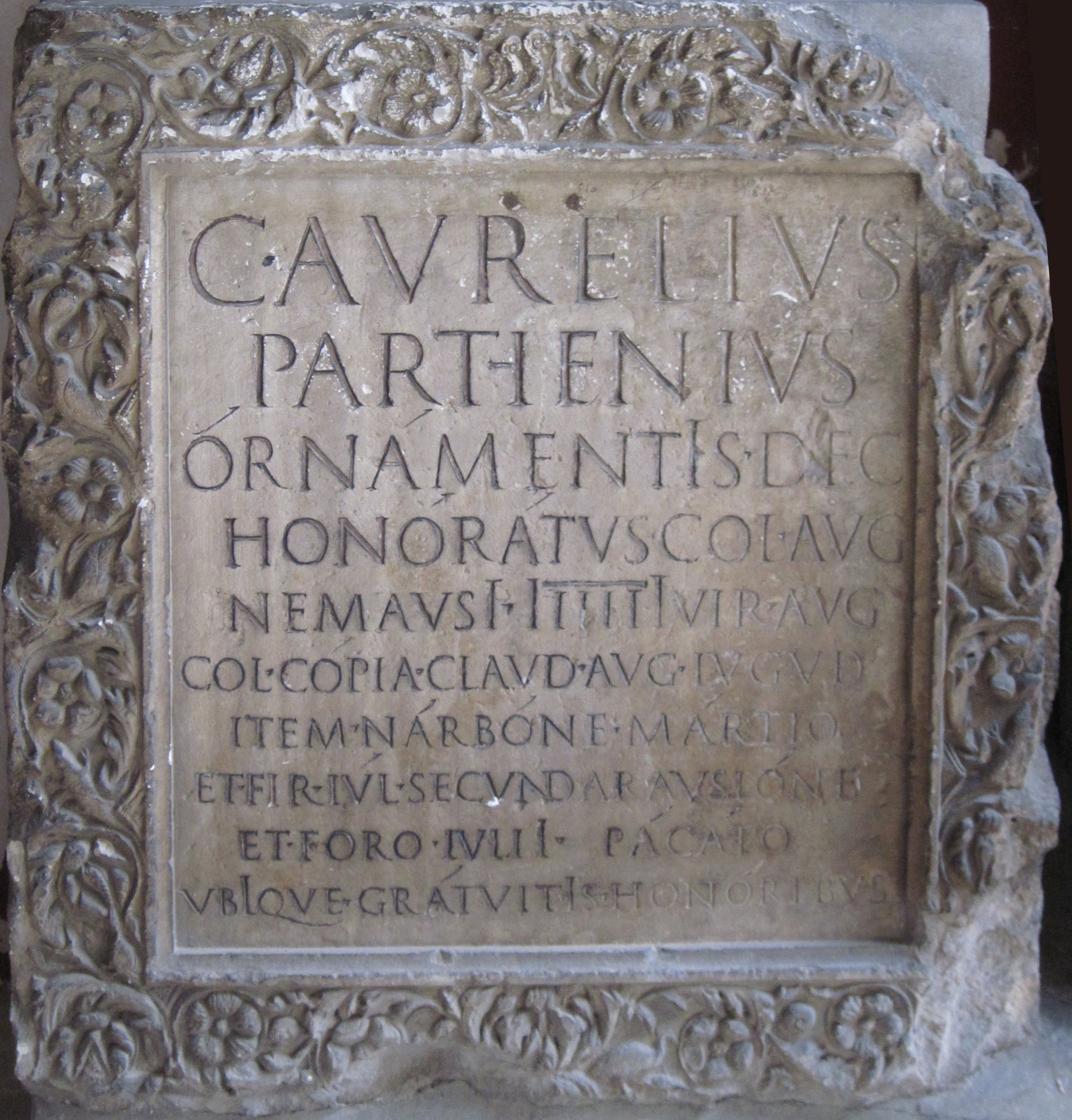
Roman inscription, ca. AD 100, showing long i's contrasting with apices on other vowels, for example órnámentIs in line 3 (besides other words), representing the vowel /iː/.

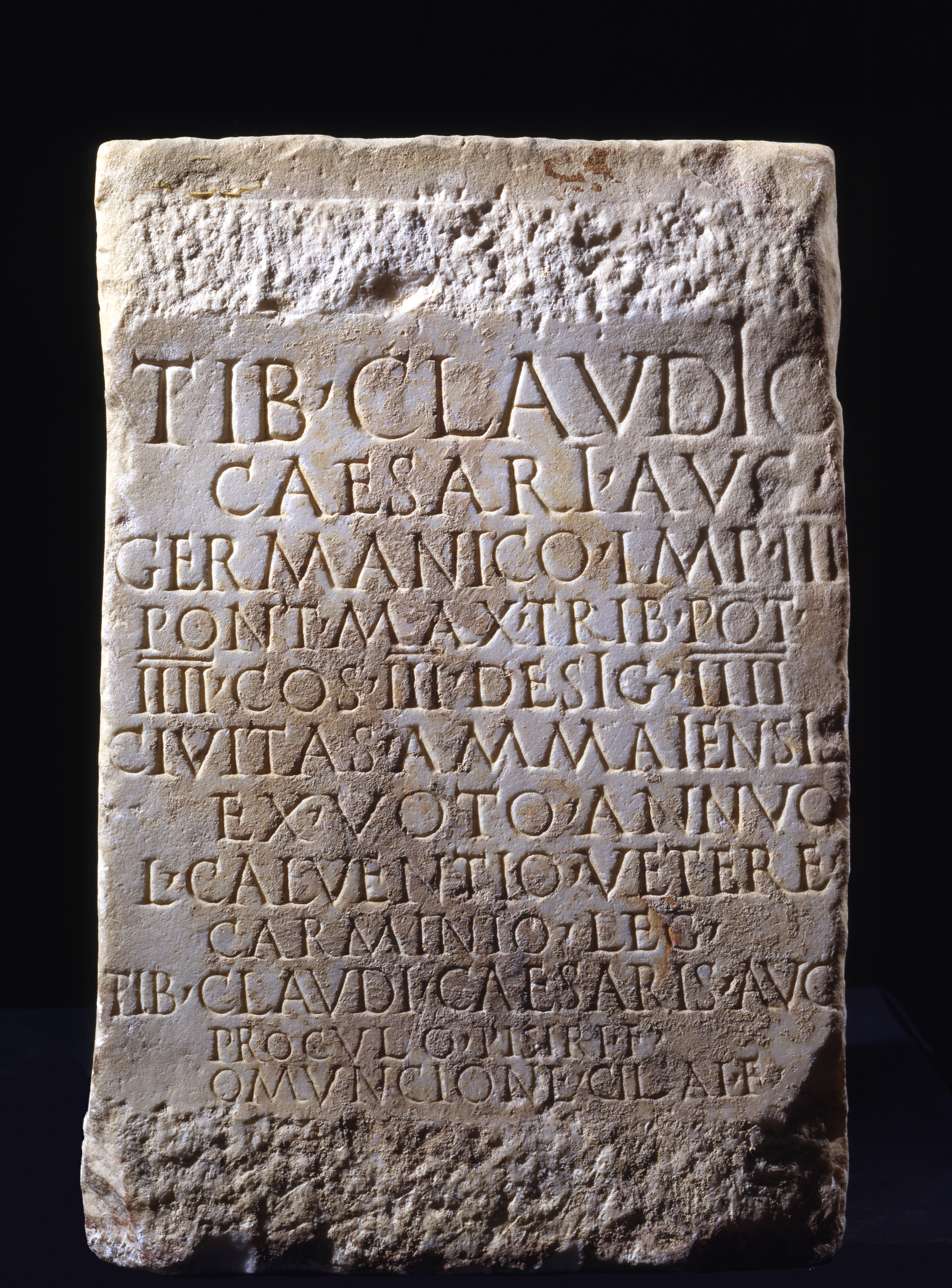
Roman inscription, ca. AD 45, showing a use of the long i letter for the close [i] sound of Latin short ĭ before a vowel: claudIo.

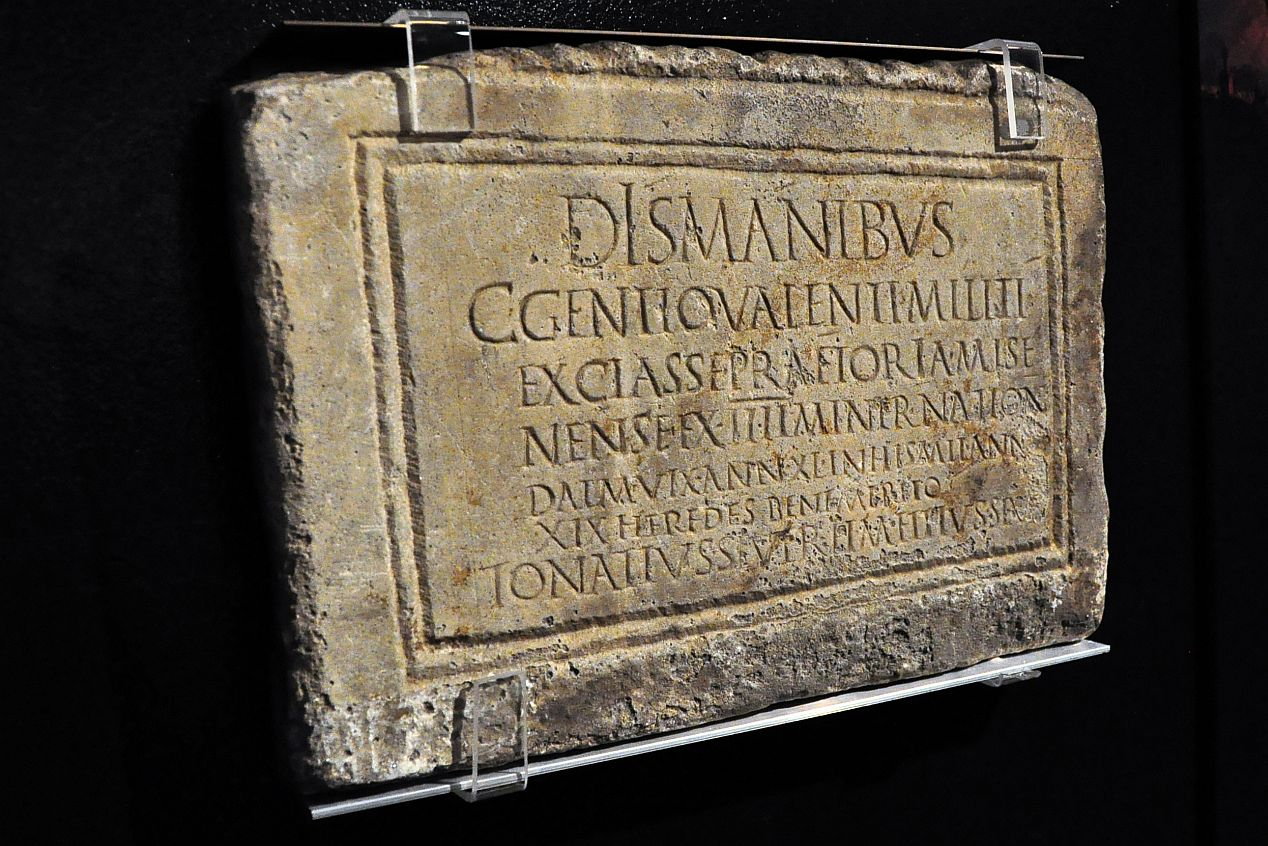
Roman inscription, ca. AD 69, showing a rare use of long i with an apex in line 1, dÍs mánibus.

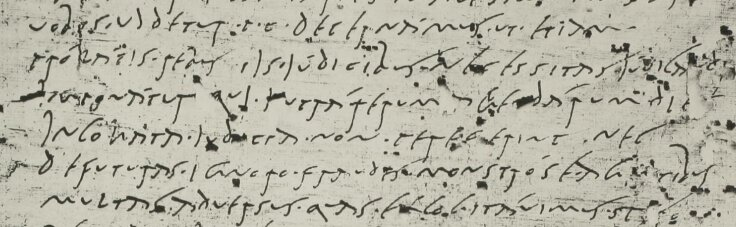
Roman letter in Old Roman cursive, ca. AD 50 from Claudius' reign, showing handwritten long i's: rebus iis · iúdicibus (line 2), imponátur qui · intrá (line 3).

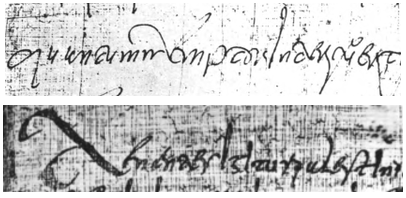
Manuscript samples in New Roman cursive from the 6th century. Top: quantum s(upra)s(cripto) emptori interfuerit. Bottom: tenentes igitur palestini.

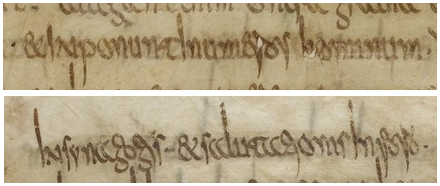
Manuscript samples in Merovingian script from ca. AD 700. Top: et inponunt in umeros hominum. Bottom: in synagogis · et salutationis in foro.

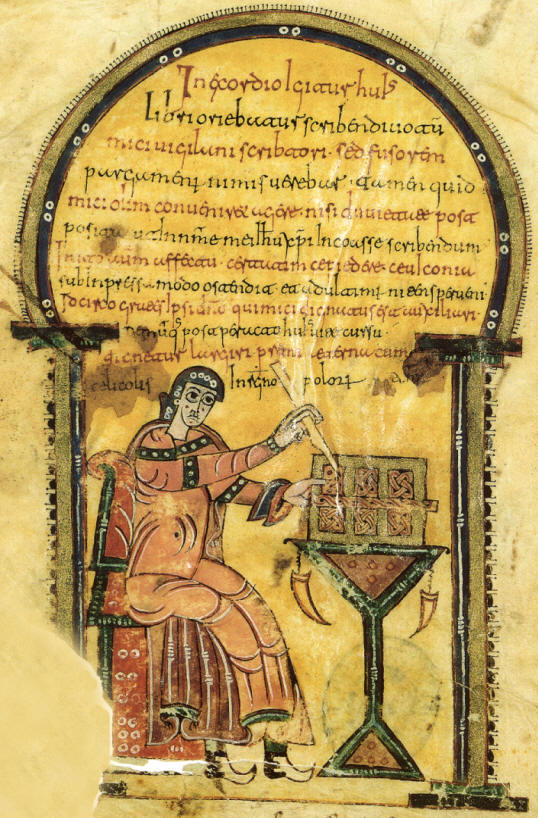
Codex Vigilanus, from the late 10th century in Visigothic script, folio 22v, preface of Vigila the scribe (pictured). The first line contains three examples of long i: in exordio igitur hui[u]s.

== See also ==
- Apex (diacritic)
