= Roman cursive =

Form of handwriting used in ancient Rome

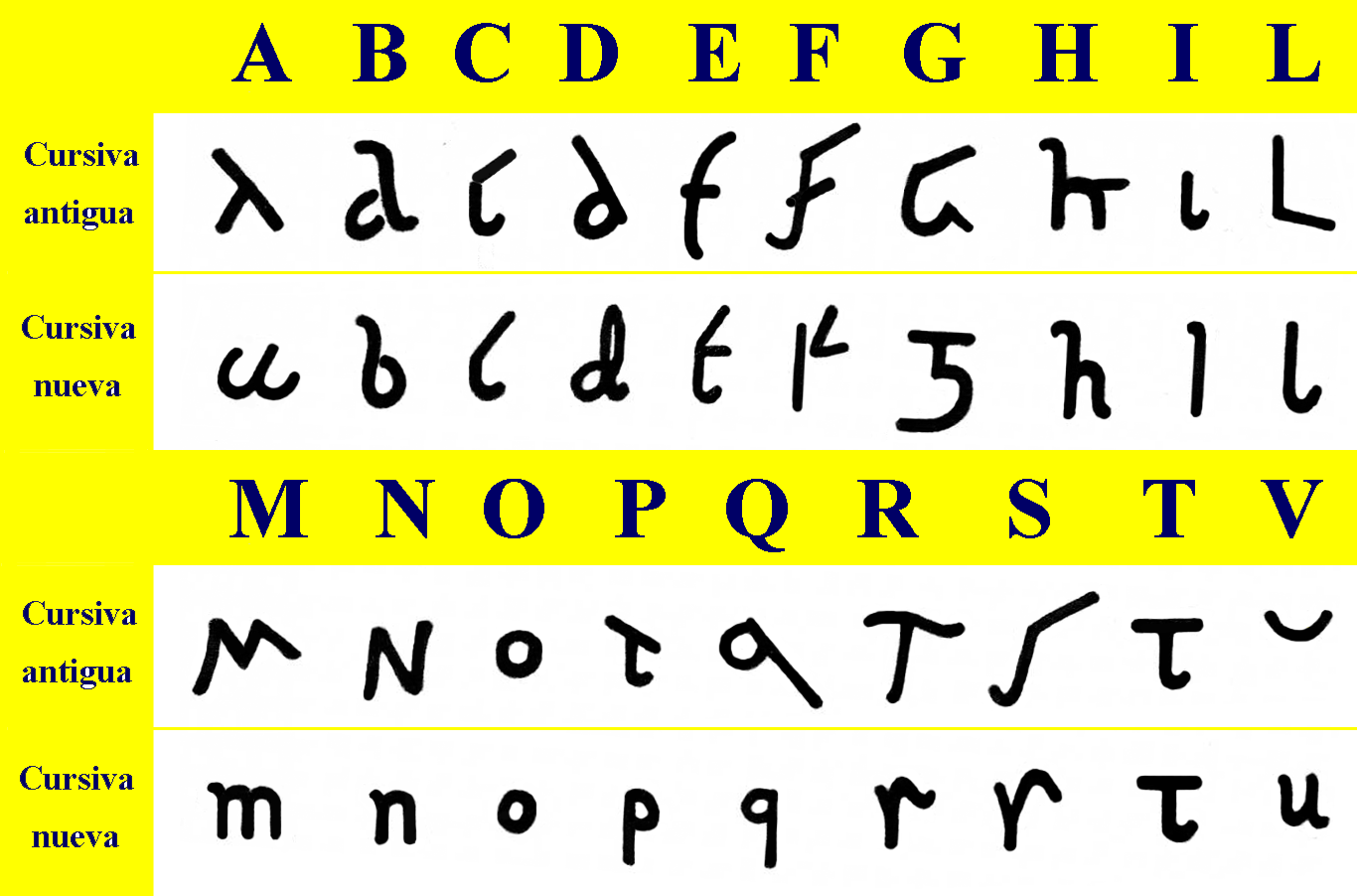
Sample of cursive letter shapes, with Old Roman Cursive in the upper rows and New Roman Cursive in the lower rows.

Roman cursive (or Latin cursive) is a form of handwriting (or a script) used in ancient Rome and to some extent into the Middle Ages. It is customarily divided into old (or ancient) cursive and new cursive, and has different forms. Roman cursive adapted to both incised and ink-written forms, depending on the medium and purpose, ranging from everyday business records and letters to ephemeral graffiti and classroom exercises.

== Old Roman cursive ==
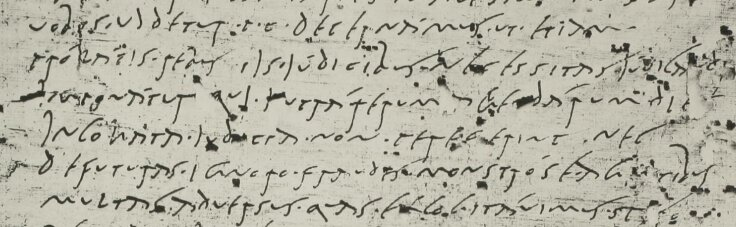
Old Roman cursive handwriting from the reign of Claudius (41 to 54 AD), with every i longum transcribed as "j":...uobis · ujdetur · p[atres] · c[onscripti] · decernámus · ut · etiam prólátis · rebus ijs · júdicibus · necessitas · júdicandi jmponátur quj · jntrá rerum · agendárum · dies jncoháta · judicia · non · peregerint · nec defuturas · ignoro · fraudes · monstróse · agentibus multas · aduersus · quas · excogitáuimus · spero...

Old Roman cursive, also called majuscule cursive and capitalis cursive, was the everyday form of handwriting used for writing letters, by merchants writing business accounts, by schoolchildren learning the Latin alphabet, and even by emperors issuing commands. A more formal style of writing was based on Roman square capitals, but cursive was used for quicker, informal writing. Most inscriptions at Pompeii, conserved due to being buried in a volcanic eruption in AD 79, are written in this script.

It is most commonly attested from the 1st century BC to the 3rd century AD, but it likely existed earlier than that. The script uses many ligatures (see, e.g., Tironian notes), and some letters are hard to recognize – "a" looks like an uncial "a", but with the left stroke still straight, "b" and "d" are hard to distinguish, "e" is a full height letter (like the "s"), "p" and "t" are very similar, and "v" is written above the baseline, resembling a floating breve. Many of the changes to the letters in Roman cursive were likely motivated by a desire to make the usage of ligatures easier. The letter "b" in Roman cursive contains a semicircular protuberance on its left side; this design feature may have been added in an attempt to conform to the needs of ligatures.

The distinctive writing style of Roman cursive emerged as the design of letters became simplified in colloquial contexts. Throughout the progression of Roman cursive, the number of strokes required to inscribe differing letters was significantly reduced. Roman cursive writing connected the strokes of differing letters to facilitate writing without lifting the writing utensil. The angles of standard letters were written as curves in Roman cursive due to ease of tracing curvatures with contemporary calligraphy tools. Curves in Roman cursive were smaller than curves in standard Latin calligraphy; this is likely because smaller curves are easier to trace than larger ones.

== New Roman cursive ==
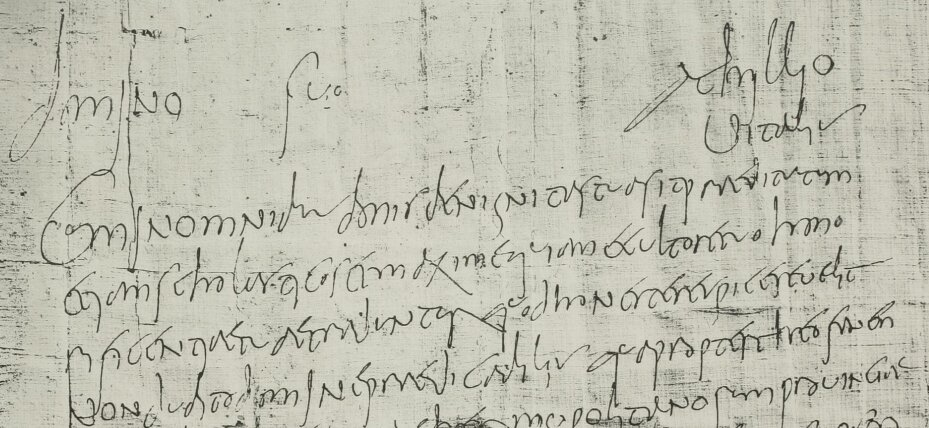
Beginning of a 4th-century Roman letter, from one Vitalis to a governor named Achillius, showing some litterae grandiores, i.e. letters made larger at the beginning of sentences, ultimately the ancestors of uppercase: domino suo achillio, uitalis. cum in omnibus bonis benignitas tua sit praedita, tum etiam scholasticos et maxime, qui a me cultore tuo hono- rificentiae tuae traduntur, quod honeste respicere velit, non dubito, domine praedicabilis. Quapropter Theofanen...

During the 1st and 2nd centuries the style of formal Roman cursive experienced dramatic changes. Documents from this period contain innumerable versions of the Roman cursive letters; many documents contain different variations on cursive letters within the same text. This process continued until scribes had adopted a uniform, professional cursive script utilized by them around the 2nd to 3rd centuries. This more standardized style typically consisted of downward strokes followed by right-leaning upward strokes. Collectively, these characteristics gave the style a two-line pattern. Although common in professional writing, this style of cursive is not universal to all documents in Roman cursive. More informal documents still retained disorganized features and were unsuitable for ligatures. During the 3rd century, informal cursive styles almost completely replaced the scribal cursive, even in formal contexts.

The informal style developed into a four-line script known as New Roman cursive, sometimes also called minuscule cursive or later Roman cursive. It was used from approximately the 3rd century to the 7th century. This style of cursive uses letterforms that are more recognizable to modern readers: "a", "b", "d", and "e" have taken a more familiar shape, and the other letters are proportionate to each other rather than varying wildly in size and placement on the line. The right-leaning vertical strokes of New Roman cursive were rounder and longer than similar strokes found in Old Roman Cursive. Although there were a smaller number of ligature combinations in New Roman cursive, some new ligature styles emerged by imposing the characteristics of one letter onto another. Letters had short lines extending horizontally towards the next letter.

These letter forms would gradually evolve into various scripts with a more regional character by the 7th century, such as the Visigothic script in Spain, the Beneventan script in southern Italy, or the Merovingian script in northern France. They also formed part of the basis of the uncial and half-uncial scripts, particularly for the letters "a", "g", "r", and "s", which in turn are the basis for Gaelic type.

== See also ==
- Chamalières tablet
- Demotic (Egyptian)
- Hieratic
- Larzac tablet
- Vindolanda tablets

== General and cited references ==
- Jan-Olaf Tjäder, Die nichtliterarischen lateinischen Papyri Italiens aus der Zeit 445–700 (Lund, 1955).
- Vindolanda Tablets on line, Centre for the Study of Ancient Documents and the Academic Computing Development Team at Oxford University.
