= English script =

English script can refer to either:

- Latin script, the script used for writing the English language
- English alphabet, the set of letters in the script
- English script (calligraphy), a font style first used in the eighteenth century in England.
- Shavian alphabet, the phonemic script for writing the English language
