= Calligraphy =

Writing as a visual art

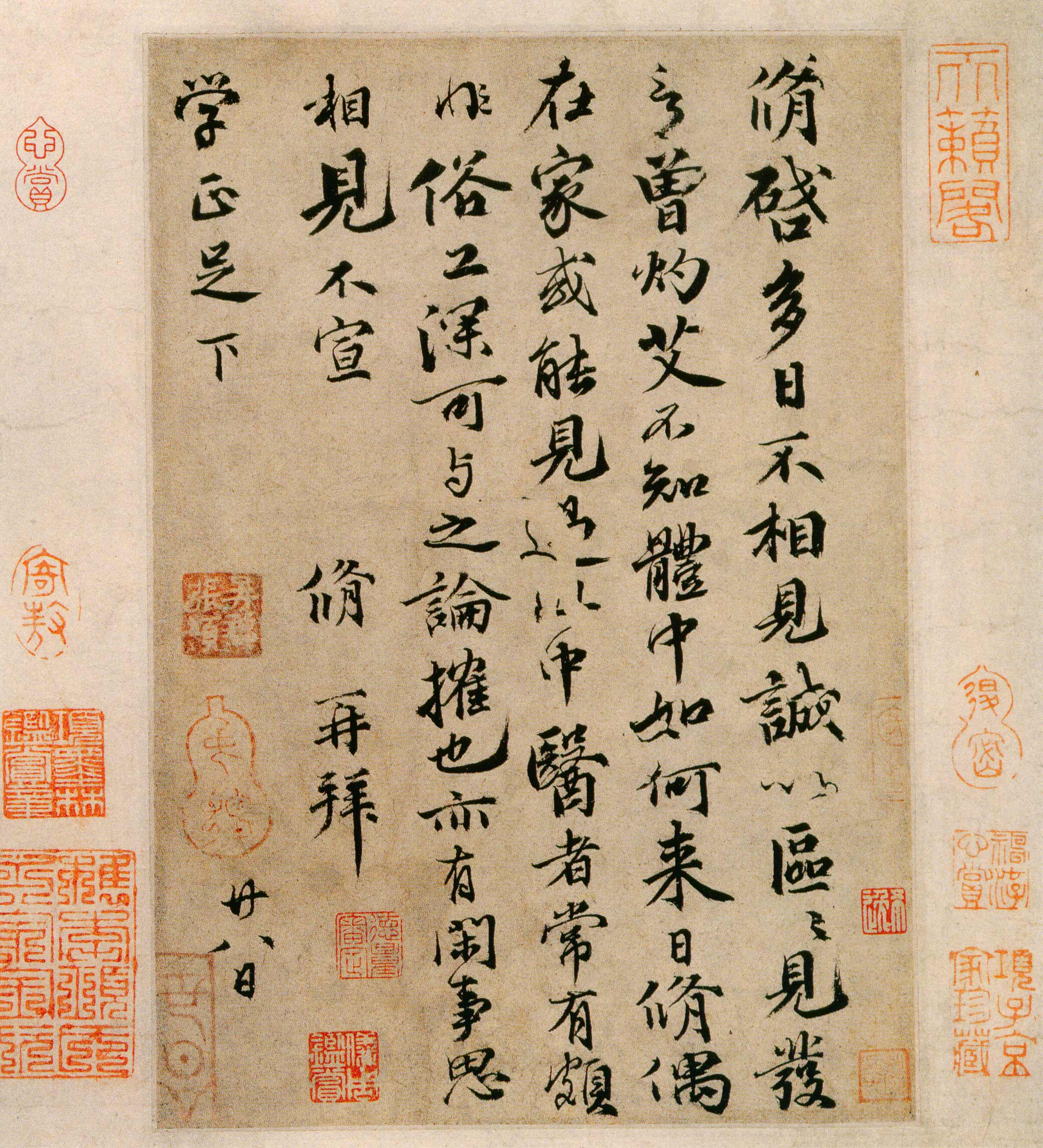
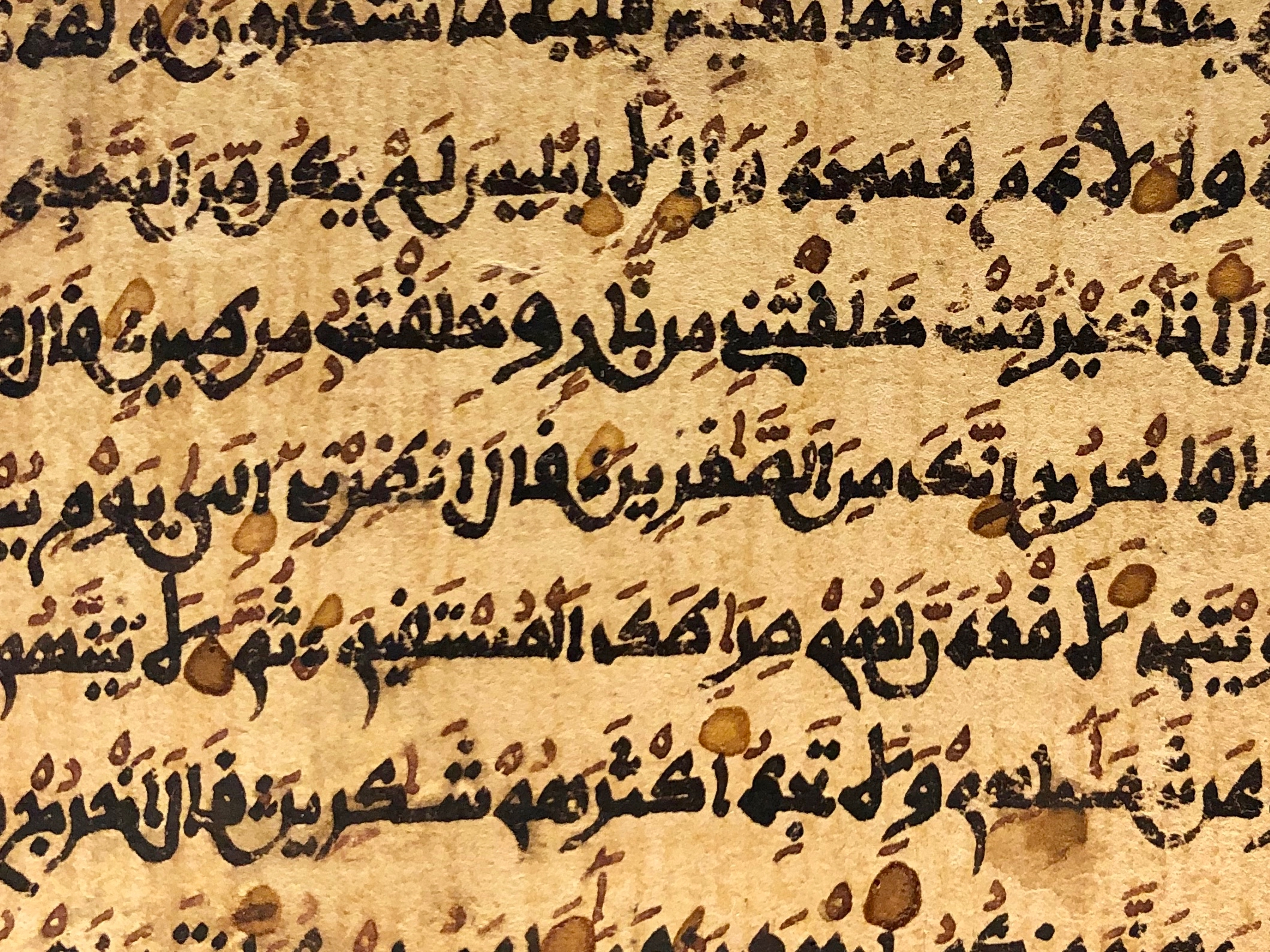
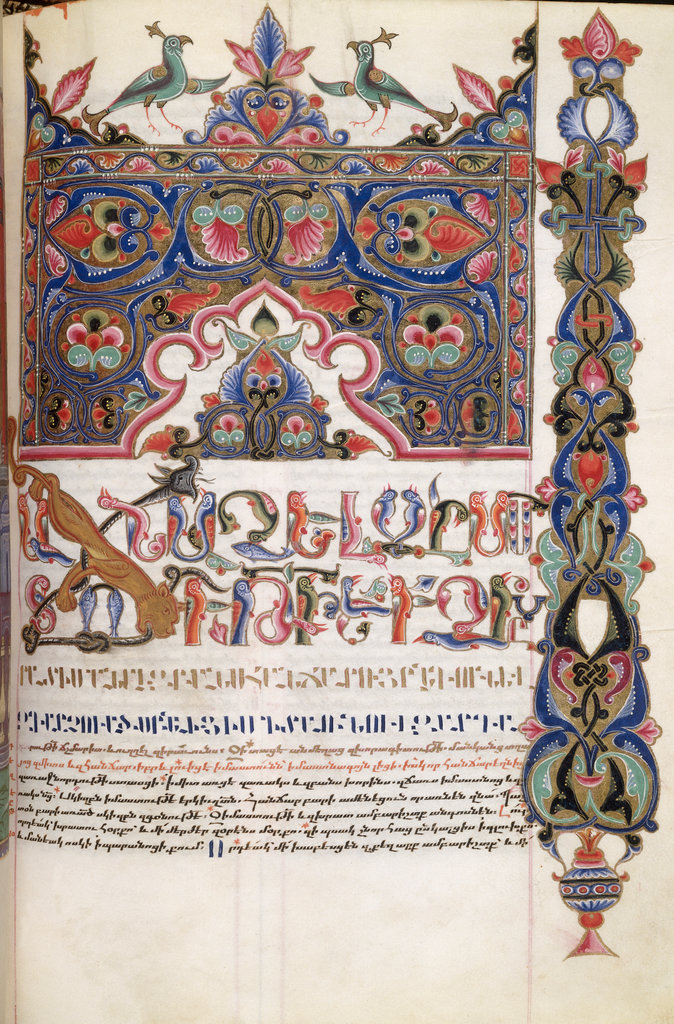
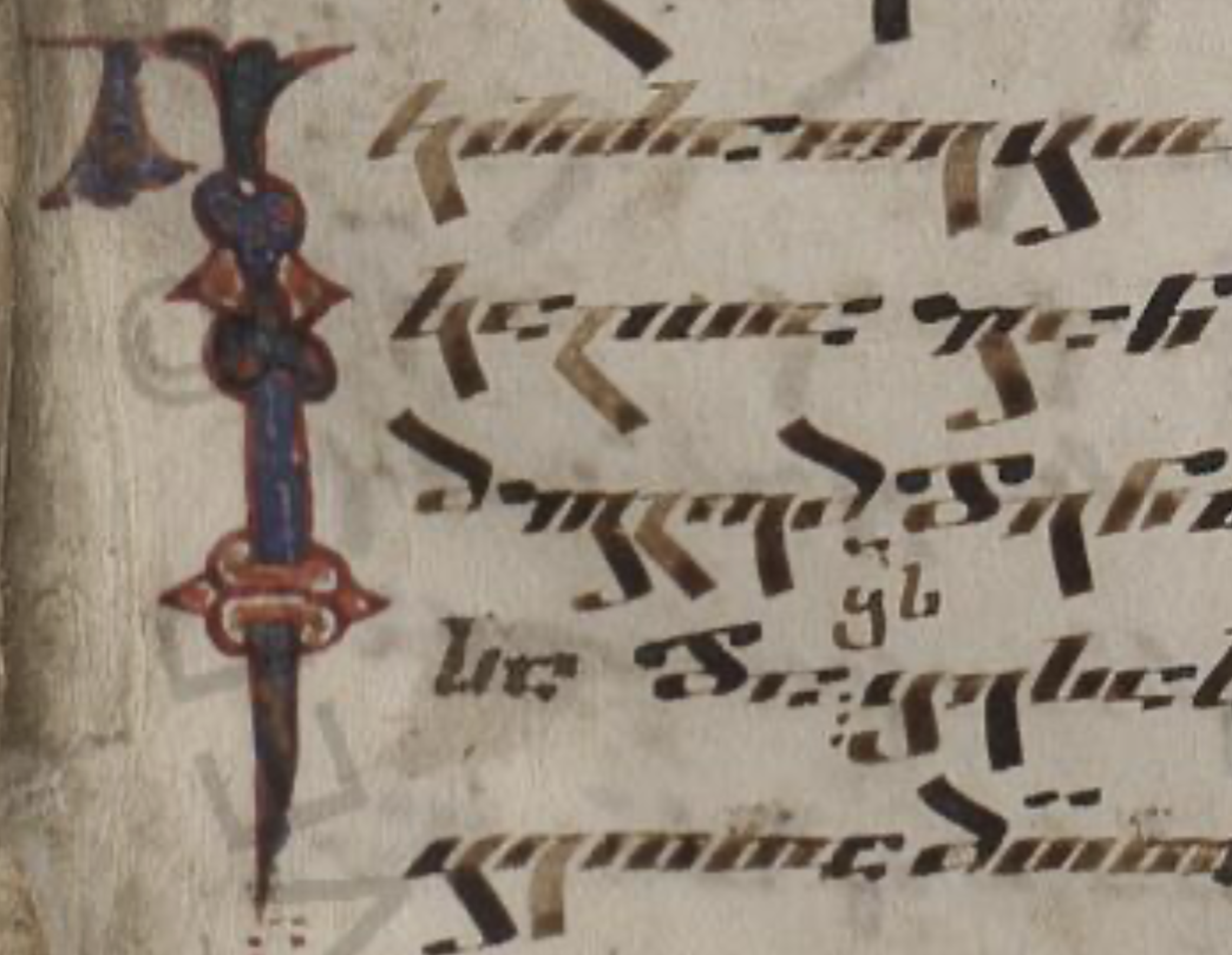
Various examples of calligraphy in different languages and writing systems throughout history

Calligraphy (from Ancient Greek καλλιγραφία (kalligraphía) 'beautiful writing') is fine handwriting as a visual art. It involves the design and execution of lettering or characters using a pen, ink brush, or other writing instruments. Classical calligraphy differs from type design and non-classical hand-lettering, though some calligraphers may practice both.

In East Asia and the Islamic world, calligraphy is a prominent element in art. Its visual form is often influenced by the meaning of the text as a whole or the individual words.

Modern Western calligraphy is mainly used in formal settings, including wedding invitations and announcements, as well as in type and computer font design, letter cutting, hand-lettered logo design, religious art, graphic design, commissioned calligraphic art, carved stone inscriptions, and memorial documents. It is also used for testimonials, birth and death certificates, maps, and other written works. Modern Western calligraphy incorporates a wide range of styles, from functional inscriptions and designs to fine art pieces, where the legibility of letters varies. Contemporary calligraphy has been defined as "the art of giving form to signs in an expressive, harmonious, and skillful manner".

== Tools ==
=== Pens and brushes ===
Pointed pen nib

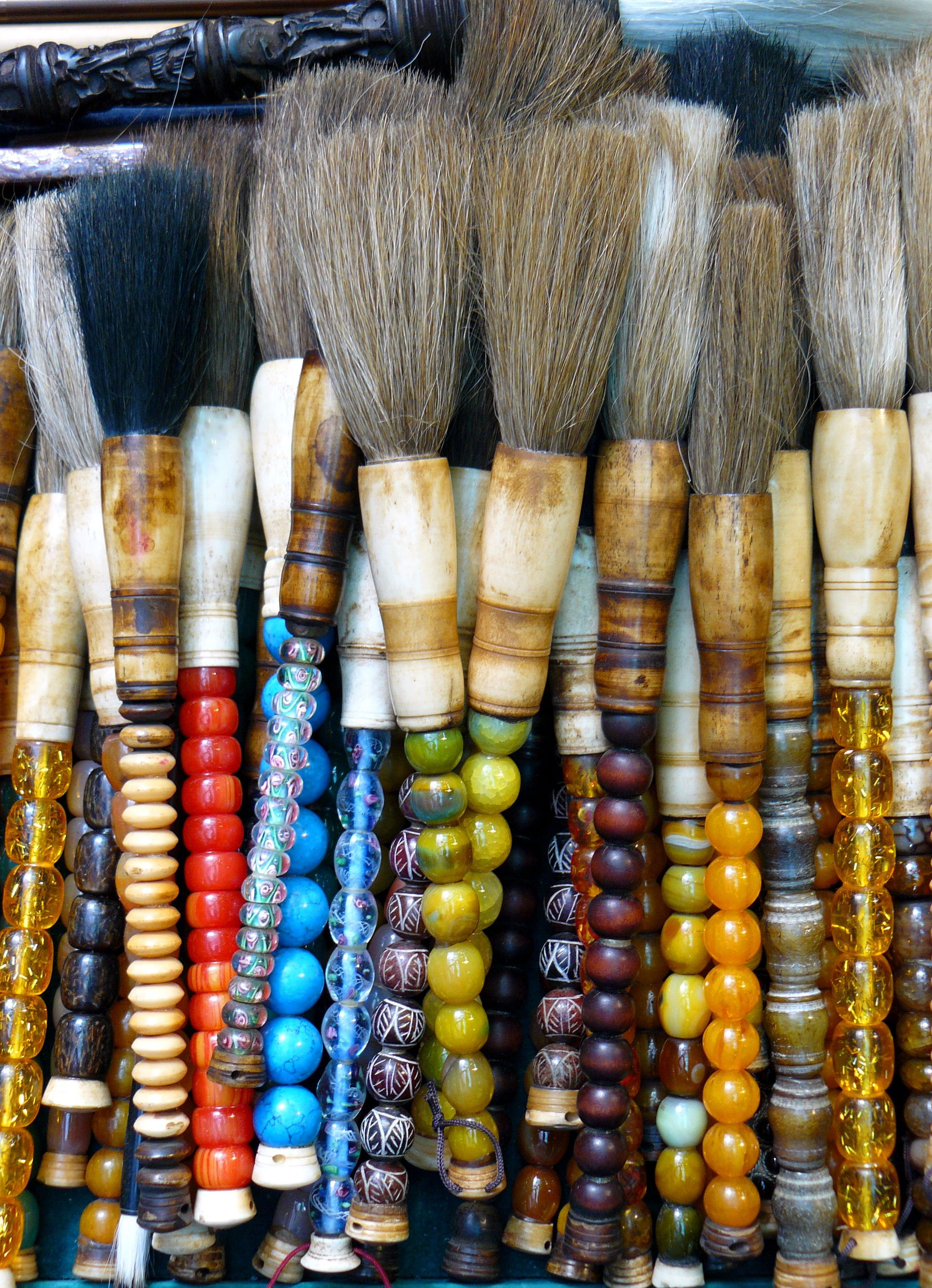
Ink brushes of various size and material

In the Western world, the principal tools for calligraphy are pens and brushes. The nibs of calligraphic pens may be flat, round, or pointed. For decorative purposes, multi-nib pens (steel brushes) can be used. Felt-tip and ballpoint pens may also be used, however, these do not produce angled lines. There are certain styles of calligraphy, such as Gothic script, that require a broad edged pen. In Asia, a makta, or penknife, is frequently used by calligraphers to cut reed pens. Natural reeds offer a wider range of motion compared to metallic pens.

Common calligraphy tools include quills, dip pens, ink brushes, fountain pens, and reed pens.

=== Inks, papers, and templates ===
The ink used for calligraphy is usually water-based and less viscous than the oil-based ink used in printing. Certain specialty papers with high ink absorption and uniform texture help draw cleaner lines. Parchment or vellum are occasionally used, because imperfections can be erased with a knife, and lines can be viewed through it without using a lightbox. Otherwise, lightboxes and templates can be used to achieve straight lines without leaving pencil marks. Ruled paper can be used directly or with a lightbox. Often, it has line spacing between one-quarter or one-half inch, although one-inch spaces are occasionally used, as is the case with Uncial script (from Latin: litterea unciales, lit. 'inch-high letters').

== East Asia ==
Chinese calligraphy is known as shūfǎ or fǎshū (書法, or 法書 in traditional Chinese, 'the method or law of writing'); Japanese calligraphy is called shodō (書道, 'the way of writing'); and Korean calligraphy is referred to as seoye (Korean: 서예; Hanja: 書藝; 'the art of writing'). The calligraphy of Chinese, Japanese, and Korean characters remains an important and highly regarded aspect of contemporary traditional East Asian culture.

=== China ===
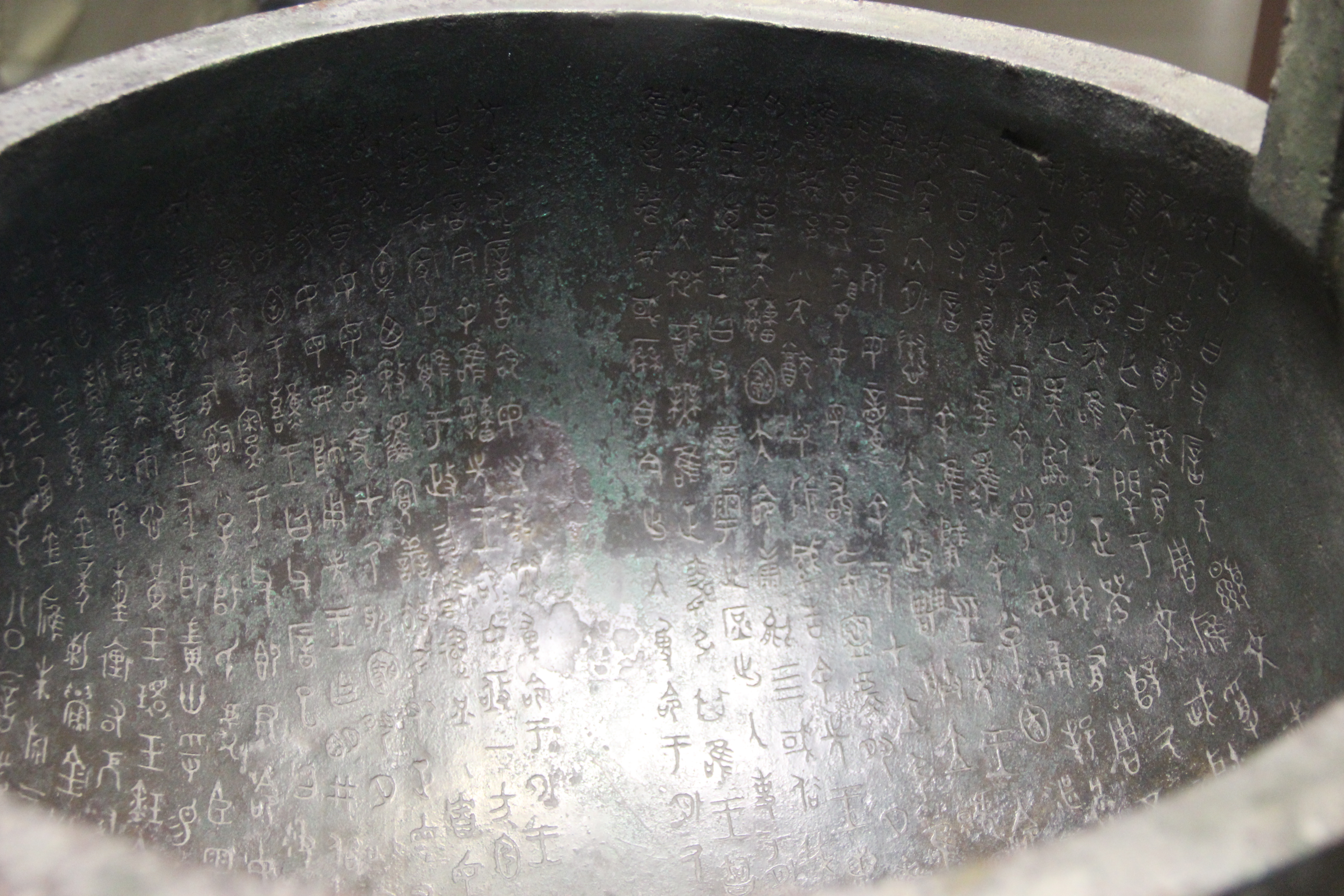
Bronze gallery, Palace Museum, Taipei, Taiwan.

In ancient China, the oldest known Chinese characters are oracle bone script (甲骨文), carved on ox scapulae and tortoise plastrons. The rulers in the Shang dynasty carved pits on such animals' bones and baked them for insight into military affairs, agricultural harvests, weather, or even procreation, as a form of scapulimancy. During the divination ceremony, a heat source was applied to the carved pits, causing the bones to crack; they were then interpreted, with the interpretation being carved directly on the shell or bone, sometimes after the characters were written with a brush. With the development of the bronzeware script (jīn wén) and large seal script (dà zhuàn), "cursive" signs continued. Mao Gong ding is one of the most famous examples of bronzeware script in Chinese calligraphic history. It contains 500 inscribed characters, the largest number of bronze inscriptions discovered to date. Moreover, each archaic kingdom of current China had its own set of characters.

In Imperial China, the graphs on old steles have been preserved and can be viewed in museums. Some date back to 200 BCE and are written in the small seal script (小篆 xiǎo zhuàn) style. Around 220 BCE, the emperor Qin Shi Huang, the first to conquer the entire Chinese basin, imposed several reforms, among them Li Si's character unification, which created a set of 3300 standardized small seal characters. Despite the fact that the main writing implement of the time was already the brush, few papers survive from this period, and the main examples of this style are on steles. The clerical script (隸書/隸书) (lì shū), which was more regularized and in some ways similar to modern text, was also authorised under Qin Shi Huang.

Between clerical script and traditional regular script, there is another transitional type of calligraphic work called Wei Bei. It started during the North and South dynasties (420–589 CE) and ended before the Tang dynasty (618–907).

The traditional regular script (kǎi shū), largely finalized by Zhong You (鐘繇, 151–230) and his followers and still in use today, is even more regularized. Its spread was encouraged by Emperor Mingzong of Later Tang (926–933), who ordered the printing of the classics using new wooden blocks in kaishu. Printing technologies encouraged shape stabilization. The kǎi shū shape of characters 1000 years ago was mostly similar to that at the end of Imperial China; however, small changes to the characters have been made. For example, the shape of 广 has changed from the version in the Kangxi Dictionary of 1716 to the version found in modern books. The Kangxi and current shapes have tiny differences, while stroke order remains the same, following the old style.

The character "永" (yǒng; "eternity") from Wang Xizhi's Lanting Xu. It famously embodies the Eight Principles of Yong, demonstrating the fundamental strokes of Chinese calligraphy.

==== Technique ====
To write Chinese characters, traditional East Asian writing uses the Four Treasures of the Study: ink brushes known as máobǐ (毛筆/毛笔), inkstick , paper, and inkstones. They are also known as the Four Friends of the Study (Korean: 문방사우/文房四友, romanized: Munbang sau) in Korean.

There are many factors that influence the final result of a calligrapher's work. Physical factors include the shape, size, stretch, and hair type of the ink brush; the colour, pigment density, and water density of the ink; and the paper's surface texture and speed in absorbing water. The calligrapher's technique also influences the result, as the look of finished characters is affected by the amount of ink and water the brush absorbs and by the brush's pressure, angle, and direction. Changing these variables produces thinner or bolder strokes and smooth or toothed borders. Eventually, the speed, acceleration, and deceleration of a skilled calligrapher's movements greatly affect the final shape of characters and give them their "spirit".

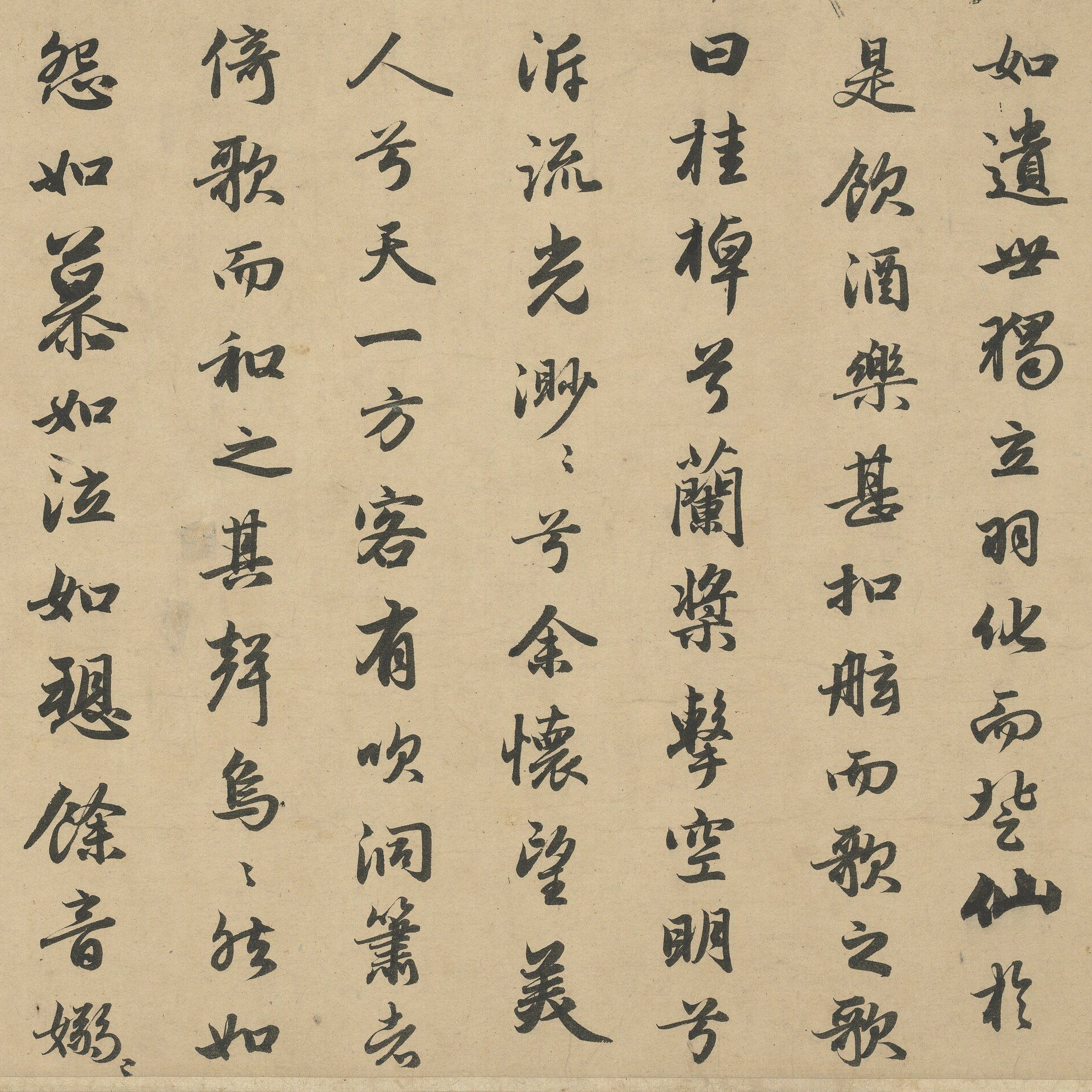
Detail of Su Shi's Former Ode on the Red Cliffs transcribed by Zhao Mengfu in semi-cursive script, Yuan dynasty (1271–1368).

==== Styles ====
Cursive styles such as xíngshū (行書/行书; semi-cursive or running script) and cǎoshū (草書/草书; cursive or grass script) are less constrained and faster, and movements made by the writing implement are more visible. The stroke orders of these styles vary more, sometimes creating radically different forms. They descend from the clerical script, at around the same time as the regular script (Han dynasty), but xíngshū and cǎoshū were used for personal notes only and not as a standard. The cǎoshū style was highly appreciated during Emperor Wu of Han's reign (141–87 BC).

Examples of modern printed styles are Song from the Song dynasty's printing press and East Asian sans-serif. These are not considered traditional styles and are normally not written.

==== Influences ====
Japanese and Korean calligraphy were each influenced by Chinese calligraphy. Calligraphy has influenced most major art styles in East Asia, including ink and wash painting, a style of Chinese, Japanese, and Korean painting based entirely on calligraphy and which uses similar tools and techniques.

The Japanese and Koreans have developed their own sensibilities and styles of calligraphy while incorporating Chinese influences.

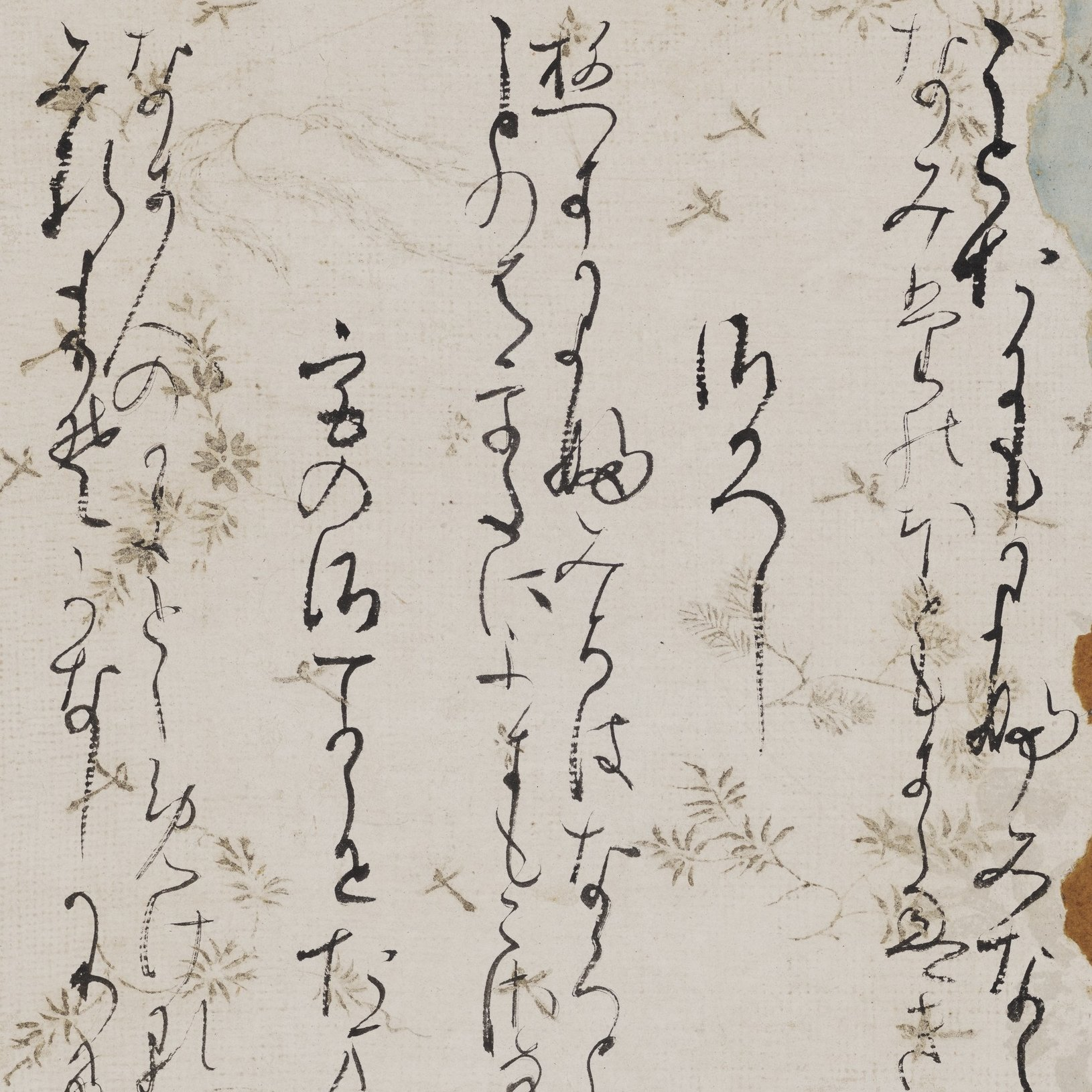
Detail of an Ishiyama-gire fragment: waka from the Ise shū in kana calligraphy on decorated paper, early 12th century (Heian period)

=== Japan ===
Japanese calligraphy extends beyond the set of CJK strokes to also include local alphabets such as hiragana and katakana, with specific characteristics such as new curves and moves, and specific materials (Japanese paper, washi 和紙, and Japanese ink).

=== Korea ===
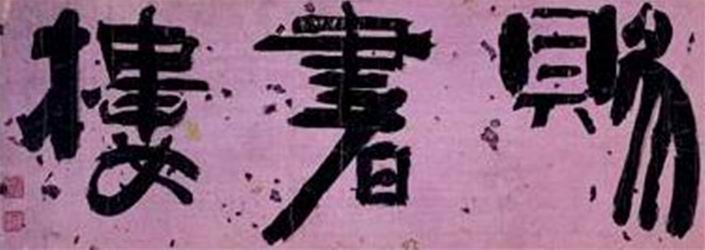
Calligraphy by Kim Jeong-hui (1786–1856), a highly celebrated Korean calligrapher

The modern Korean alphabet and its use of the circle required the creation of a new technique not used in traditional Chinese calligraphy.

=== Mongolia ===
Mongolian calligraphy is also influenced by Chinese calligraphy, from tools to style.

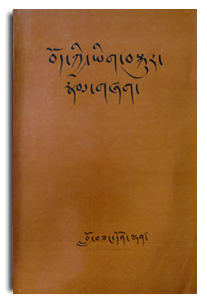
Cover of a book of Tibetan Calligraphy and letter writing by Losang Thonden

=== Tibet ===
Tibetan calligraphy is central to Tibetan culture. The script is derived from Indic scripts. The nobles of Tibet, such as the High Lamas and inhabitants of the Potala Palace, were often capable calligraphers. For centuries, Tibet has been a center of Buddhism, which places high significance on the written word. Although there is not a large body of secular pieces, they do exist, but usually are related in some way to Tibetan Buddhism. Almost all high religious writing involved calligraphy, including letters sent by the Dalai Lama and other religious and secular authorities. Calligraphy is particularly evident on prayer wheels, although this calligraphy was forged rather than penned or brushed, much like Arab and Roman calligraphy on buildings. Although originally done with a reed, Tibetan calligraphers now use chisel-tipped pens and markers as well.

== Southeast Asia ==
=== Philippines ===
The Philippines has many ancient and indigenous scripts collectively called Suyat scripts. Various ethno-linguistic groups in the Philippines prior to Spanish colonization in the 16th century through modern independence have used these scripts in various media. By the end of the colonial period, only four suyat scripts had survived and remained in everyday use in some communities. These four scripts are Hanunó'o of the Hanuno'o Mangyan people, Buhid of the Buhid Mangyan people, Tagbanwa script of the Tagbanwa people, and Palaw'an of the Palaw'an people. All four scripts were inscribed in the UNESCO Memory of the World international register, under the name Philippine Paleographs (Hanunoo, Build, Tagbanua and Pala’wan), in 1999.

In protest of colonization, many artists and cultural experts have revived suyat scripts that went extinct after the Spanish introduced the Latin alphabet. The scripts being revived include the Kulitan script of the Kapampangan people, the badlit script of various Visayan ethnic groups, the Iniskaya script of the Eskaya people, the Baybayin script of the Tagalog people, and the Kur-itan script of the Ilocano people, among many others. The diverse array of distinct suyat scripts are collectively called Filipino suyat calligraphy. Calligraphy using the Western alphabet and the Arabic alphabet are also prevalent in the Philippines due to its colonial past. However, the Western and Arabic alphabets are not considered suyat, and this practice is not considered suyat calligraphy.

=== Vietnam ===
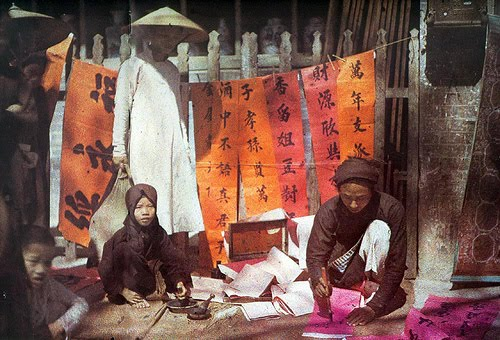
Vietnamese street vendors selling handwritten Tết calligraphy couplets, Hanoi, 1915.

Vietnamese calligraphy is called thư pháp ( 書法, literally "the way of words") and is based on Chữ Nôm and Chữ Hán, the historical Vietnamese writing system rooted in the historical influence of Chinese characters and replaced with the Latin alphabet as a result of French colonial influence. Calligraphic traditions maintaining the historical employment of Han characters continue to be preserved in modern Vietnamese calligraphy.

== South Asia ==
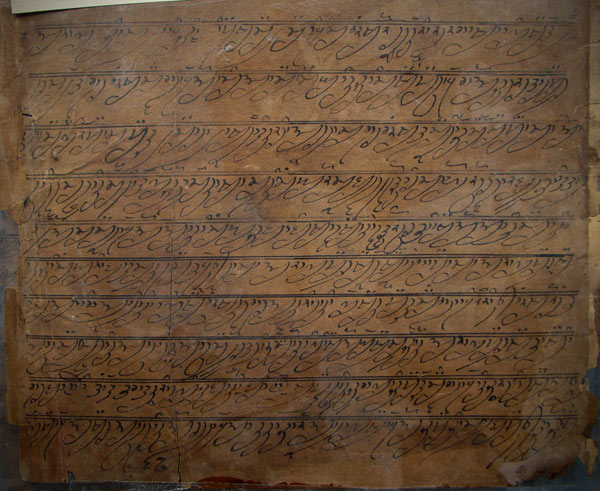
Sikh Calligraphy in the Gurmukhi Script

The preservation of religious texts is the most common purpose for Indian calligraphy. Buddhist monks were trained in calligraphy and shared responsibility for duplicating sacred scriptures. Jaina traders incorporated illustrated manuscripts celebrating Jaina saints. These manuscripts' fine calligraphy was produced using inexpensive material like palm leaves and birch.

=== Nepal ===
Nepalese calligraphy is primarily created using the Ranjana script. The script itself, along with its derivatives (like Lantsa, Phagpa, Kutila) are used in Nepal, Tibet, Bhutan, Leh, Mongolia, coastal Japan, and Korea to write "Om mani padme hum" and other sacred Buddhist texts, mainly those derived from Sanskrit and Pali.

=== India ===
Nasta'liq calligraphy was often used in India, Pakistan, and Bangladesh, especially under Mughal rule.

== Islamic world ==
Samples of Islamic calligraphy samples
The phrase Bismillah in an 18th-century Islamic calligraphy from the Ottoman region

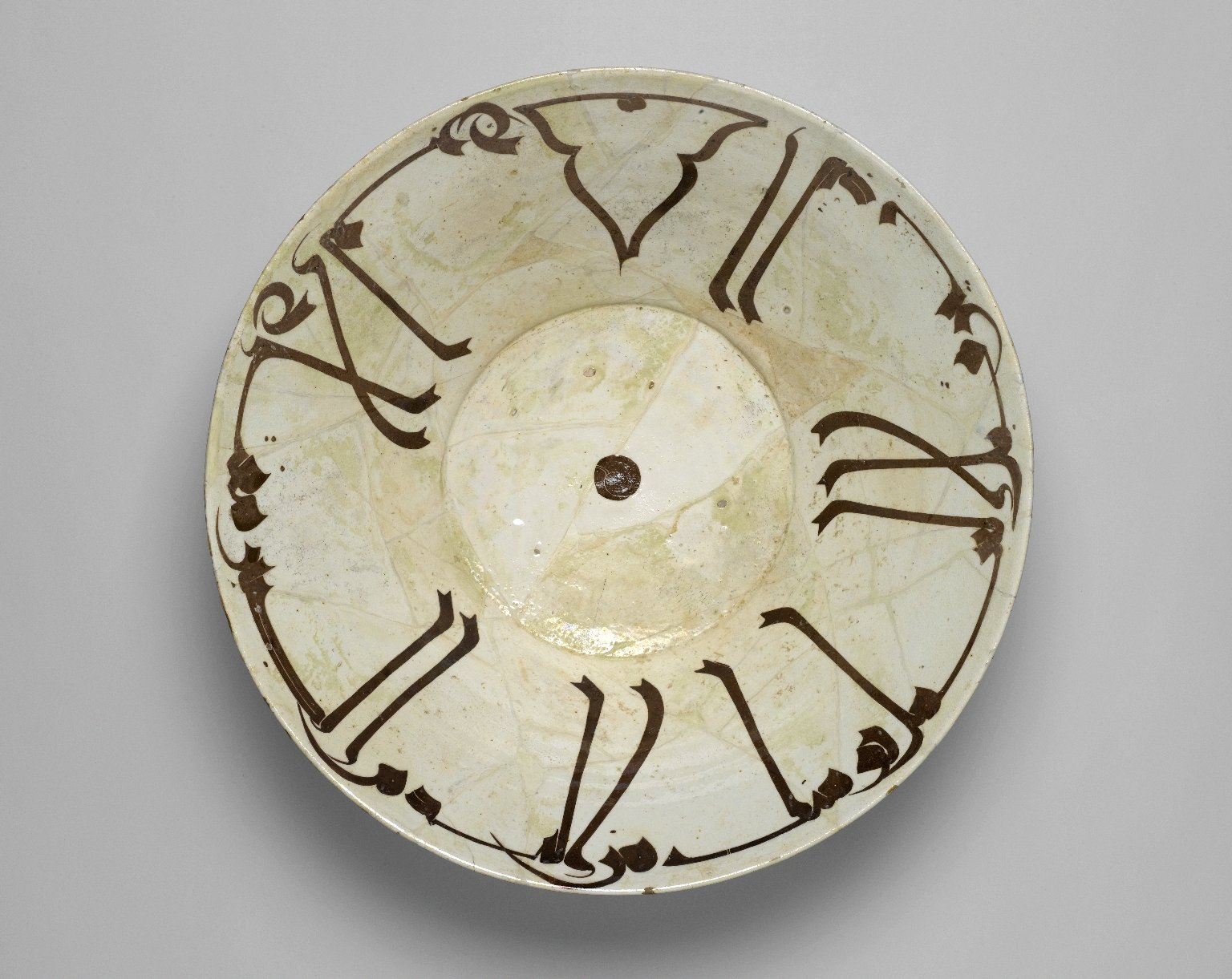
Bowl with Kufic Calligraphy, (Persia) 10th century

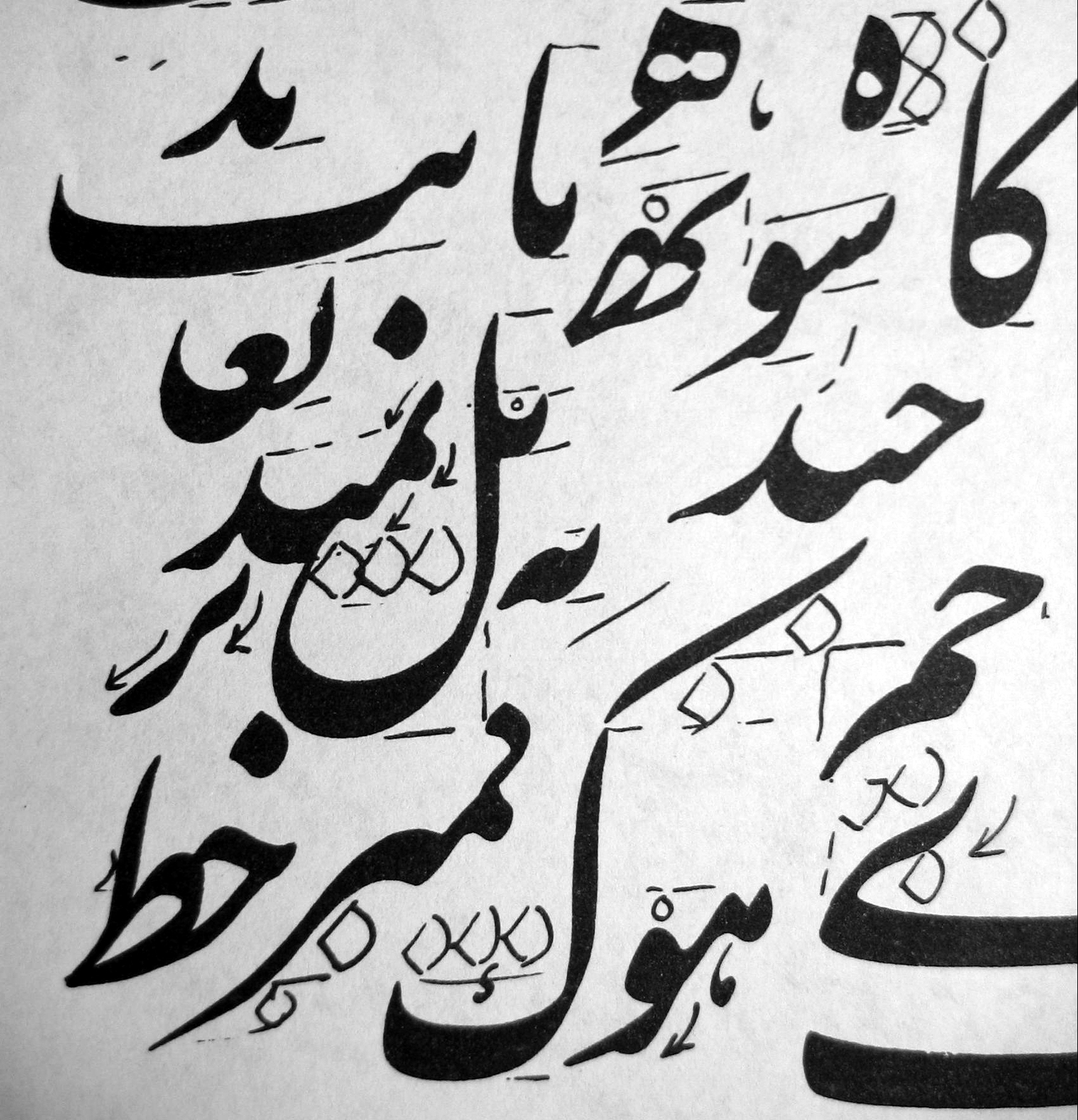
Sample showing Nastaliq proportional rules (Persian and Urdu languages)

Islamic calligraphy (Note: Arabic: khatt ul-yad (خط اليد) Persian: Khosh-Nevisi (خوشنویسی.) has evolved alongside Islam and the Arabic language. As it is based on Arabic letters, some call it "Arabic calligraphy". However the term "Islamic calligraphy" is a more appropriate term, as it comprises all works of calligraphy by Muslim calligraphers of different national cultures, such as Persian or Ottoman calligraphy, from Al-Andalus in medieval Spain to China.

Islamic calligraphy is associated with geometric Islamic art (Arabesque) on the walls and ceilings of mosques, as well as on manuscript pages or other materials. Contemporary artists in the Islamic world may draw on the heritage of calligraphy to create modern calligraphic inscriptions, like corporate logos or abstractions.

During the Ottoman civilization, Islamic calligraphy attained special prominence. The city of Istanbul is an open exhibition hall for many kinds and varieties of calligraphy, from inscriptions in mosques to fountains, schools, houses, etc.

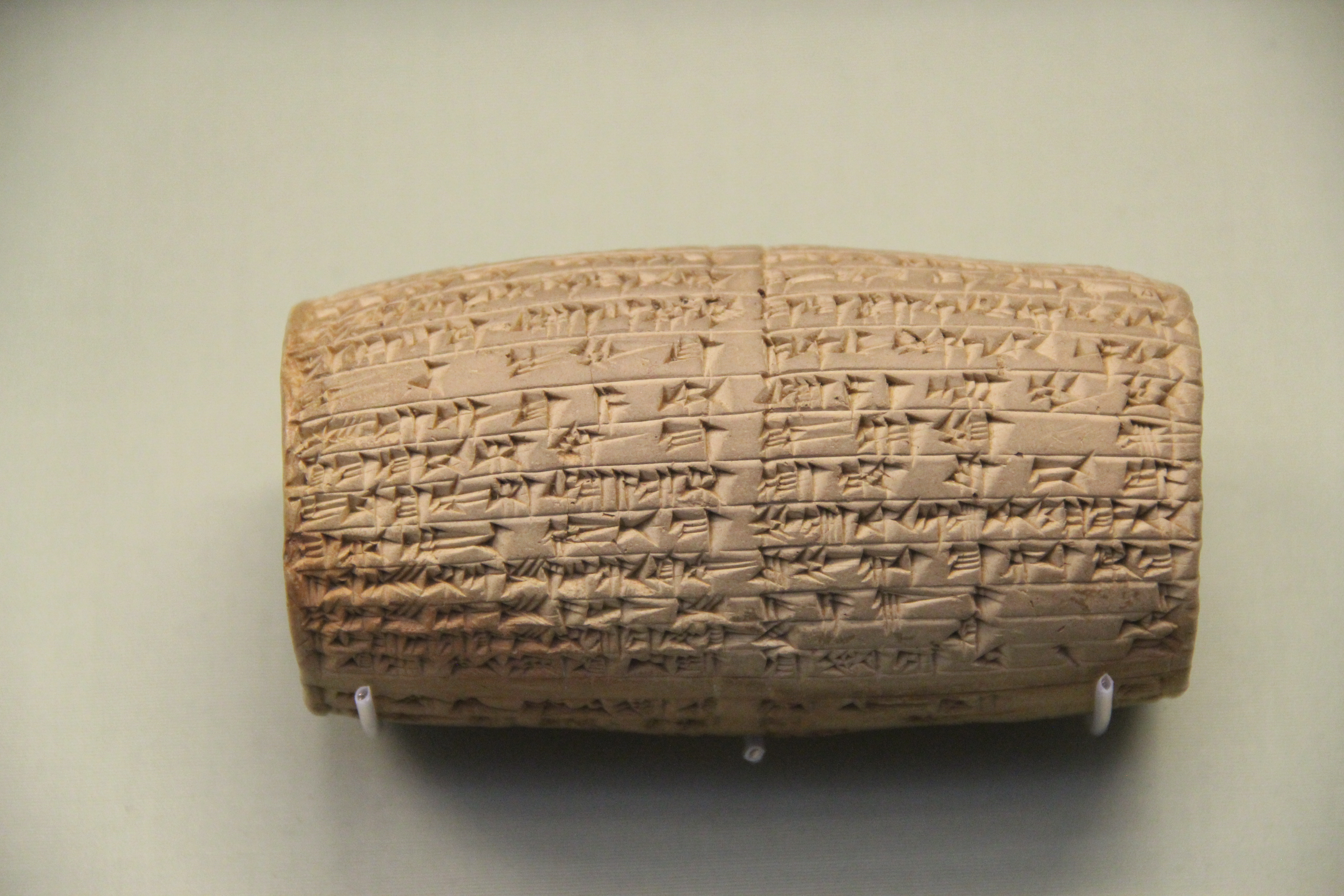
Clay cylinder with cuneiform script of King Nabonidus, Mesopotamia, British Museum, London, England, UK.

=== Antiquity ===
Ancient Persian script was invented by about 600–500 BCE to provide monument inscriptions for the Achaemenid kings. Centuries later, other scripts such as "Pahlavi" and "Avestan" scripts were used in ancient Persia. Pahlavi was a Middle Persian script developed from the Aramaic script and became the official script of the Sassanian Empire (224–651 CE).

=== Contemporary scripts ===
The Nasta'liq style is the most popular contemporary style among classical Persian calligraphy scripts; Persian calligraphers call it the "bride of calligraphy scripts." It has strict rules for graphical shape of the letters and for combination of the letters, words, and composition of the whole calligraphy piece.

Nasta'liq is quite popular in India and Pakistan, and is mainly used for Urdu.

== Africa ==
=== Ethiopia ===
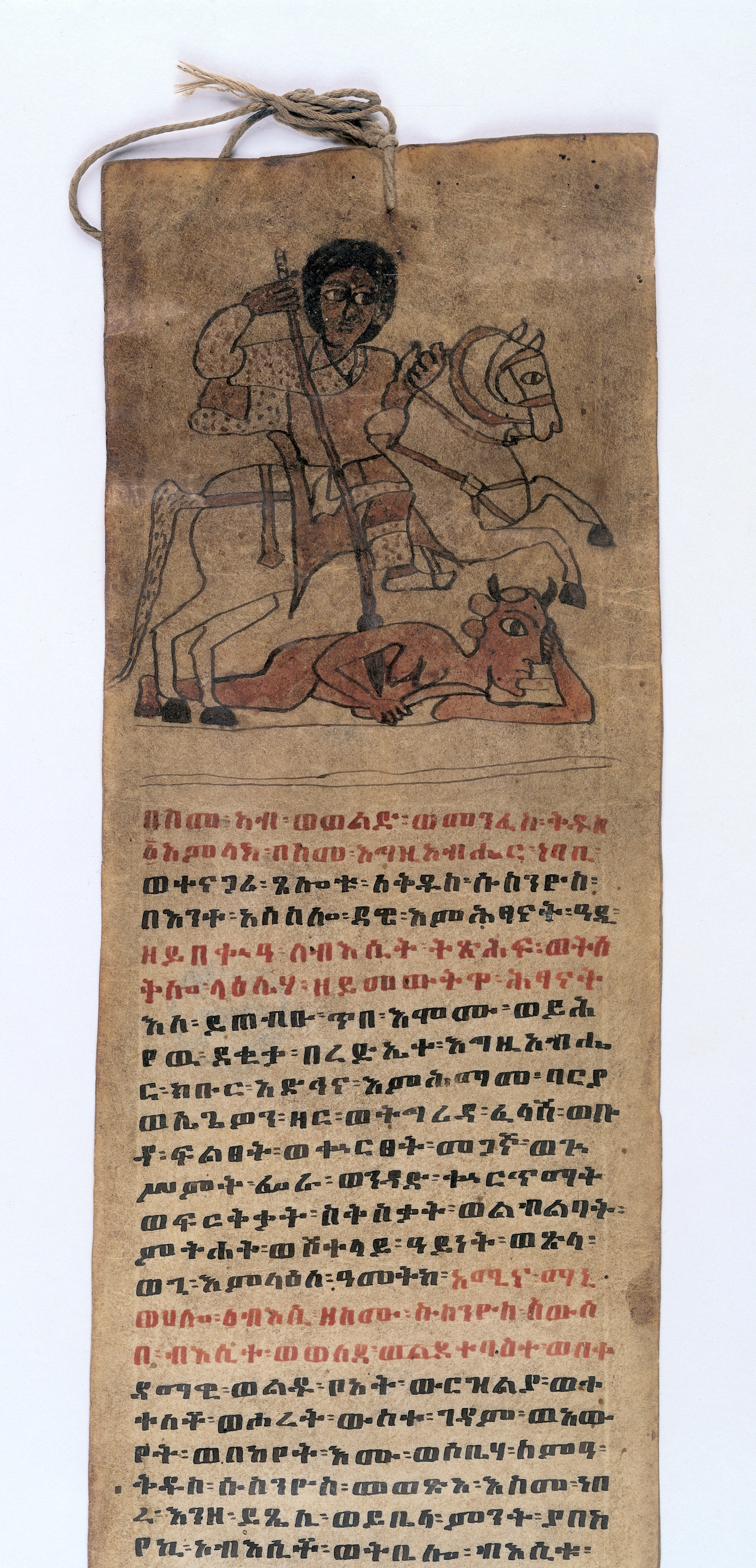
A painting of Susenyos I (r. 1607–1632) on a Ge'ez prayer scroll meant to dispel evil spirits, Wellcome Collection, London, England

Ethiopian calligraphy began with the Ge'ez script, which replaced Epigraphic South Arabian in the Kingdom of Aksum, which was developed specifically for Ethiopian Semitic languages. In languages that use it, including Amharic and Tigrinya, the script is called Fidäl, which means 'script' or 'alphabet'. The Epigraphic South Arabian letters were used for a few inscriptions into the 8th century, though not in any South Arabian language since Dʿmt.

== Europe ==
Calligraphy samples from Europe and near East
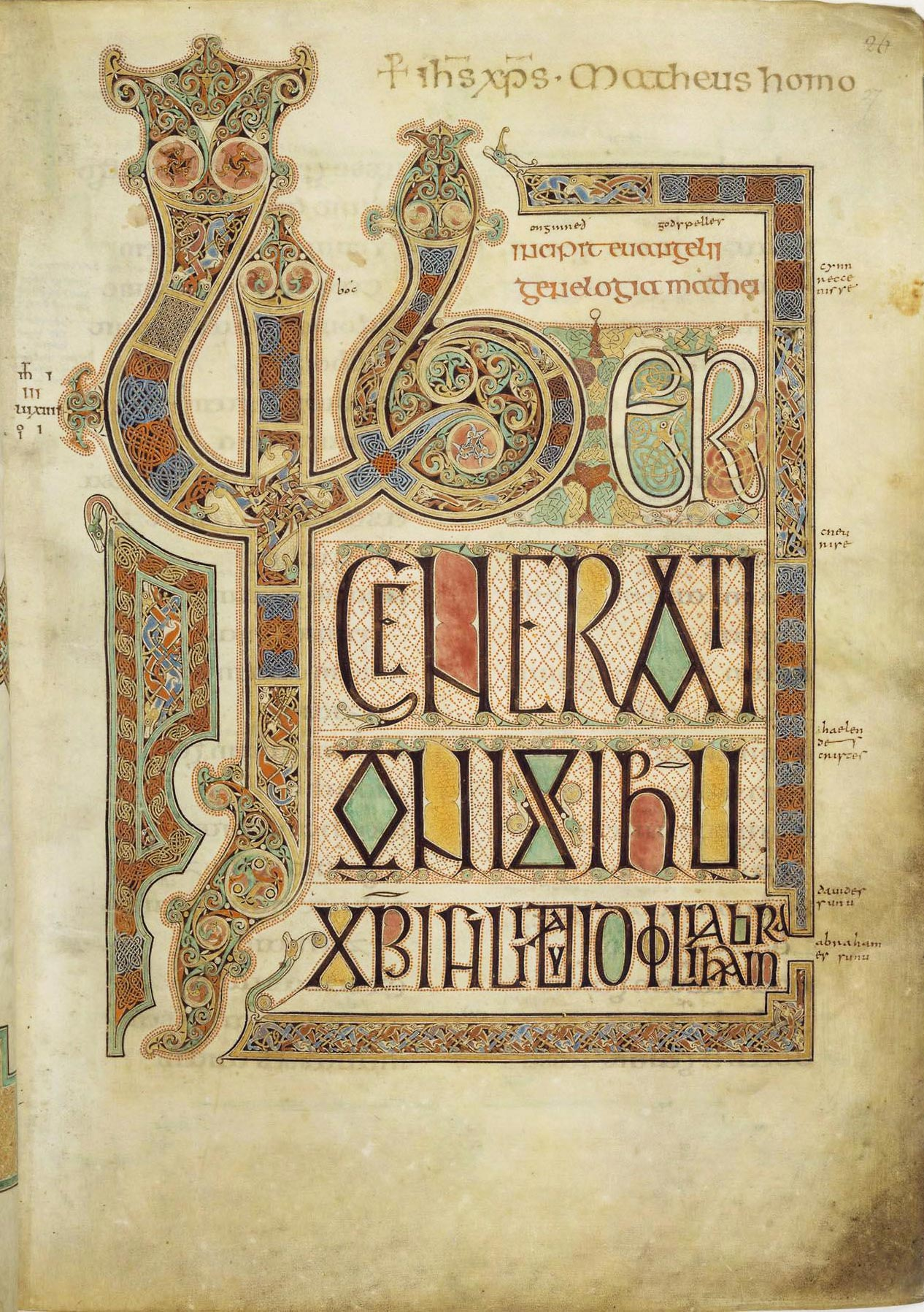
Folio 27r from the Lindisfarne Gospels (c. 700) contains the incipit from the Gospel of Matthew.

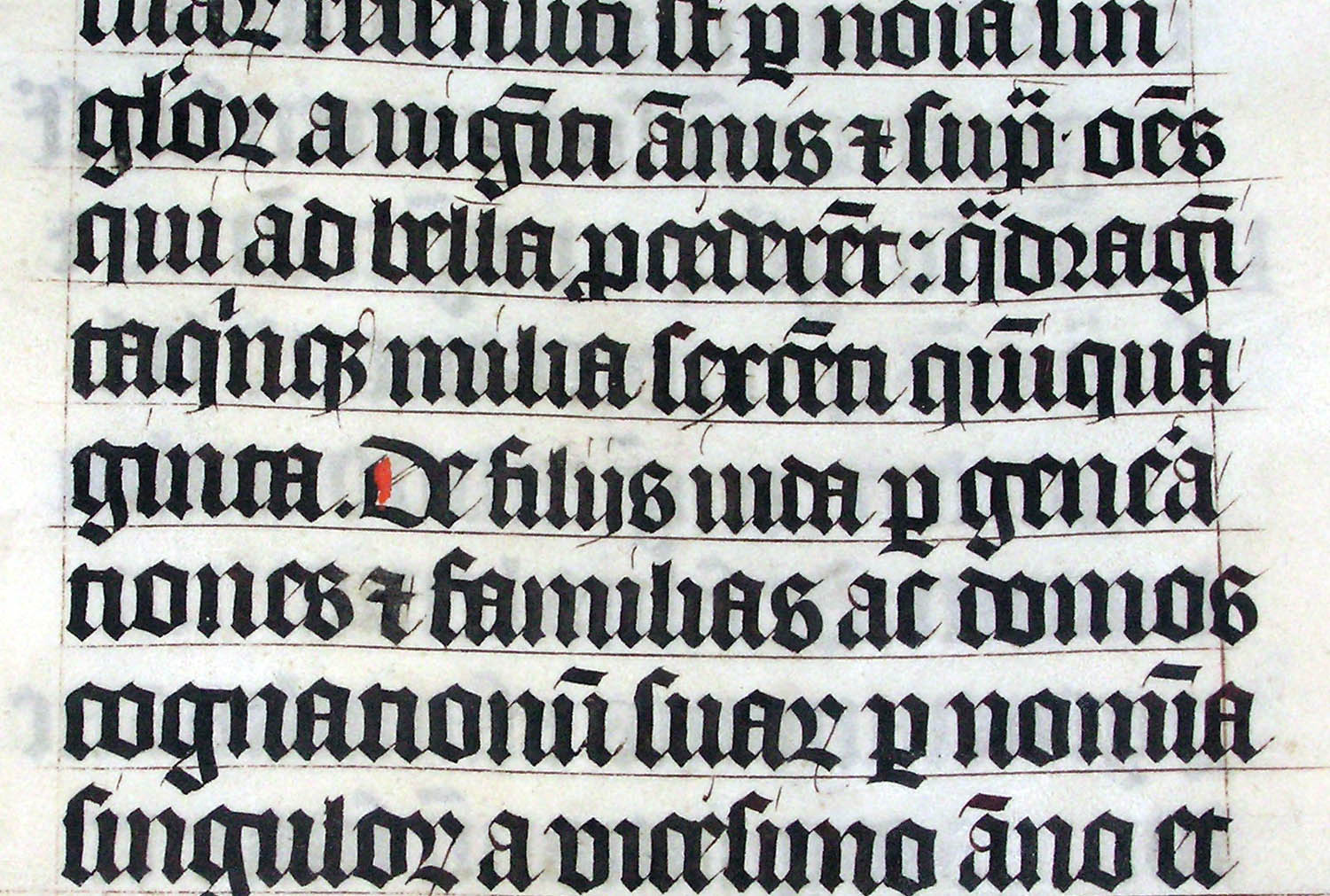
Calligraphy in a Latin Bible of 1407 on display in Malmesbury Abbey, England. This Bible was handwritten in Belgium, by Gerard Brils, for reading aloud in a monastery.

Georgian calligraphy is a centuries-old tradition of an artistic writing of the Georgian language with its three scripts.

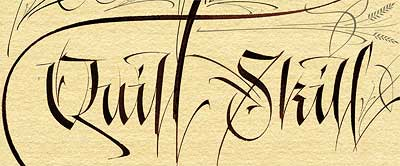
Modern Western calligraphy

Calligraphy in Europe often uses Latin script in Western Europe and Greek, Armenian, Georgian, or Cyrillic script in Eastern Europe.

=== Ancient Rome ===
The Latin alphabet first appeared about 600 BCE in ancient Rome, and by the first century CE, it had developed into Roman imperial capitals carved on stones, rustic capitals painted on walls, and Roman cursive written on tablets for daily use. In the second and third centuries, the uncial lettering style developed. As writing withdrew to monasteries, uncial script was found more suitable for copying the Bible and other religious texts. When the Roman Empire fell and Europe entered the early Middle Ages during the fourth and fifth centuries, monasteries were the main preservers of calligraphic traditions.

At its height, the Roman Empire reached as far as Britain, and its literary influence remained long after its fall. The Semi-uncial generated the Irish Semi-uncial, the small Anglo-Saxon. Each region developed its own standards following the main monastery of the region (i.e. Merovingian script, Laon script, Luxeuil script, Visigothic script, Beneventan script), which are mostly cursive.

=== Western Europe ===
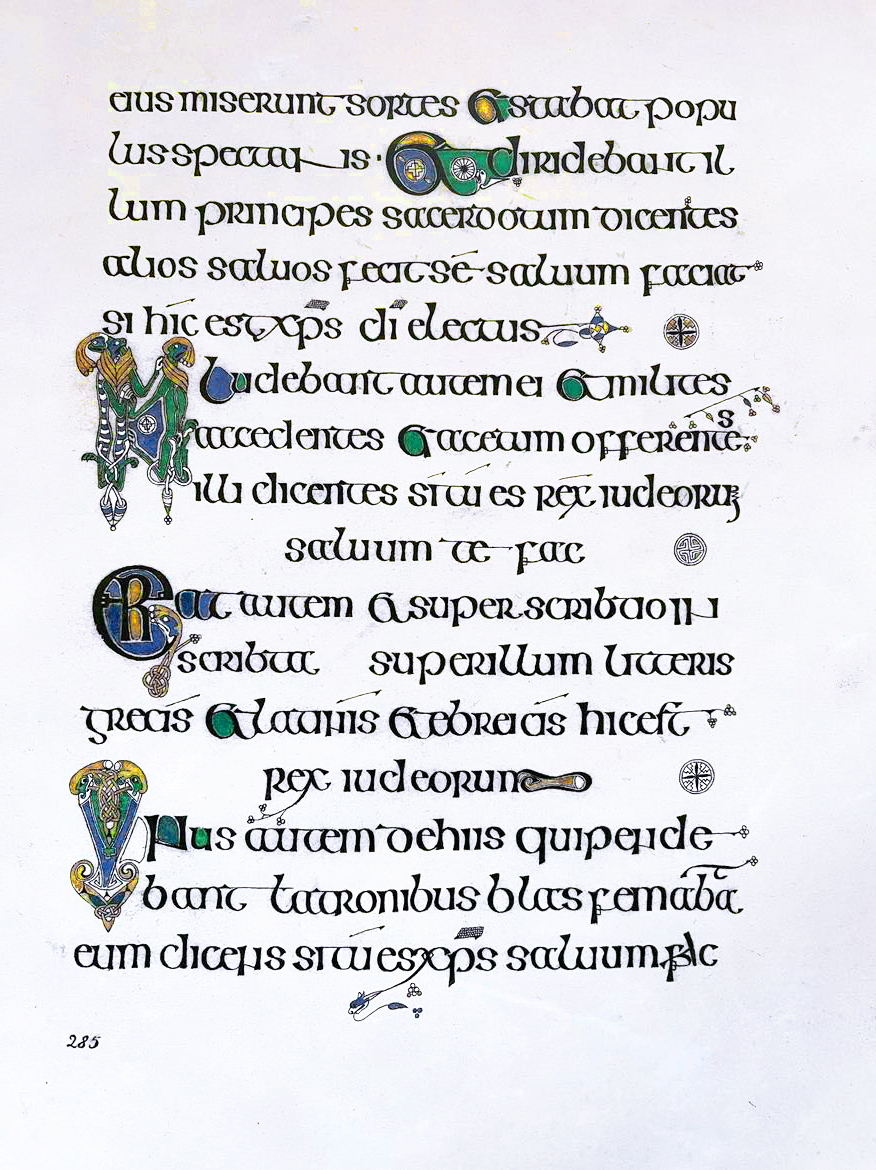
Book of Kells, Folio 283 R, reproduction and study in 1991 of the Insular Majuscule by Mario Kleff.

Christian churches developed writing through the prolific copying of the Bible, the Breviary, and other sacred texts. Two distinct styles of writing known as uncial and half-uncial (from the Latin uncia, or "inch") developed from a variety of Roman book hands. The 7th–9th centuries in Northern Europe were the heyday of Celtic illuminated manuscripts, such as the Book of Durrow, Lindisfarne Gospels and the Book of Kells.

In his devotion to improving scholarship, Charlemagne recruited "a crowd of scribes", according to Alcuin of York. Alcuin developed the style known as the Caroline or Carolingian minuscule. The first manuscript in this hand was the Godescalc Evangelistary (finished 783) – a Gospel book written by the scribe Godescalc. Carolingian is the script from which modern book type descends.

In the eleventh century, the Caroline evolved into the blackletter ("Gothic") script, which was more compact and made it possible to fit more text on a page. The Gothic calligraphy styles became dominant throughout Europe and, in 1454, when Johannes Gutenberg developed the first printing press in Mainz, Germany, the Gothic style was adopted as the first European typeface.

Evolution of minuscule.

In the 15th century, the rediscovery of old Carolingian texts encouraged the creation of the humanist minuscule or littera antiqua in Italy.

The 17th century saw the Bâtarde script from France, and the 18th century saw the English script spread across Europe and the world through books.

In the mid-1600s, French officials, flooded with documents written in various hands and varied levels of skill, complained that many such documents were beyond their ability to decipher. Therefore, the Office of the Financier restricted all legal documents to three hands, the Coulée, the Ronde, and Bâtarde.

While there were many great French masters at the time, the most influential in proposing these hands was Louis Barbedor, who published Les Ecritures Financière Et Italienne Bastarde Dans Leur Naturel, c. 1650.

=== Eastern Europe ===
Other European styles use the same tools and practices but differ by character set and stylistic preferences.

While West Slavic languages use Latin scripts, East Slavic languages have a different history and consequently use Cyrillic script, having evolved from the 10th century to today.

==== Style ====
Unlike a typeface, handwritten calligraphy is characterised by irregularity in the characters which vary in size, shape, style, and color, producing a distinct aesthetic value, although it may also make the content more difficult to decode for some readers. As with Chinese or Islamic calligraphy, Western calligraphic script employed the use of strict rules and shapes. Quality writing had a rhythm and regularity to the letters, with a "geometrical" order of the lines on the page. Each character had, and often still has, a precise stroke order.

Unique features of sacred Western calligraphy include the illumination of the first letter of each book or chapter in medieval times. A decorative "carpet page" may precede the literature, filled with ornate, geometrical depictions of bold-hued animals. The Lindisfarne Gospels (715–720 CE) are an early example. Many of the themes and variations of today's contemporary Western calligraphy are found in the pages of The Saint John's Bible. A particularly modern example is Timothy Botts' illustrated edition of the Bible, with 360 calligraphic images as well as a calligraphy typeface.

== Americas ==
=== Antiquity ===
==== Maya ====
Maya calligraphy was expressed with Maya glyphs; modern Maya calligraphy is mainly used on seals and monuments in the Yucatán Peninsula in Mexico. Maya glyphs are rarely used in government offices; however, in Campeche, Yucatán and Quintana Roo, calligraphy in Maya languages is written in Latin script rather than Maya glyphs. Some commercial companies in southern Mexico use Maya glyphs as symbols of their business. Some community associations and modern Maya brotherhoods use Maya glyphs as symbols of their groups.

Most of the archaeological sites in Mexico such as Chichen Itza, Labna, Uxmal, Edzna, Calakmul, etc. have glyphs in their structures. Carved stone monuments known as stele are common sources of ancient Maya calligraphy.

=== 19th and 20th century ===
In the 19th century, American penman Platt Rogers Spencer invented Spencerian script. The script enjoyed widespread popularity in the United States and Canada, becoming the standard script for business correspondence into the 20th century. Spencerian script inspired other calligraphers in North America like Charles Paxton Zaner and A. N. Palmer to invent their own scripts.

== Modern calligraphy ==
=== Revival ===
After the rise of printing in the 15th century, the production of illuminated manuscripts began to decline. However, this did not mean the end of calligraphy. At the beginning of the 16th century, a clear distinction between handwriting and more elaborate forms of lettering and script began to make its way into manuscripts and books.

The modern revival of calligraphy began at the end of the 19th century, influenced by the aesthetics and philosophy of William Morris and the Arts and Crafts movement. Edward Johnston is regarded as being the father of modern calligraphy. After studying published copies of manuscripts by architect William Harrison Cowlishaw, he was introduced to William Lethaby in 1898, principal of the Central School of Arts and Crafts, who advised him to study manuscripts at the British Museum. (Note: Such as the Ramsey Psalter, BL, Harley MS 2904)

This inspired Johnston's interest in the art of calligraphy with a broad-edged pen. He began a teaching course in calligraphy at the Central School in Southampton Row, London from September 1899, where he influenced the typeface designer and sculptor Eric Gill. He was commissioned by Frank Pick to design a new typeface for the London Underground, still used today (with minor modifications).

Johnston has been credited for single-handedly reviving the art of modern penmanship and lettering through his books and teachings – his handbook on the subject, Writing & Illuminating, & Lettering (1906) was particularly influential on a generation of British typographers and calligraphers, including Graily Hewitt, Stanley Morison, Eric Gill, Alfred Fairbank and Anna Simons. Johnston also devised the crafted round calligraphic handwriting style, written with a broad pen, known today as the Foundational hand. Johnston initially taught his students an uncial hand using a flat pen angle, but later taught his hand using a slanted pen angle. He first referred to this hand as "Foundational Hand" in his 1909 publication, Manuscript & Inscription Letters for Schools and Classes and for the Use of Craftsmen.

=== After 1900 ===
Graily Hewitt taught at the Central School of Arts and Crafts and, together with Johnston, published throughout the early part of the century. Hewitt's use of gilding in calligraphy contributed to a prolific output on type design, produced between 1915 and 1943. He is attributed with the revival of gilding with gesso and gold leaf on vellum. Hewitt helped found the Society of Scribes & Illuminators (SSI) in 1921.

Hewitt has received both criticism and support in his rendering of Cennino Cennini's medieval gesso recipes. Donald Jackson, a British calligrapher, has sourced his gesso recipes from earlier centuries, a number of which are not presently in English translation. Graily Hewitt created the patent announcing the award to Prince Philip of the title of Duke of Edinburgh on 19 November 1947, the day before his marriage to Queen Elizabeth.

Anna Simons, Johnston's pupil, helped create interest in calligraphy in Germany with her German translation of Writing and Illuminating, and Lettering in 1910. Austrian Rudolf Larisch, a teacher of lettering at the Vienna School of Art, published six lettering books that influenced German-speaking calligraphers. Because German-speaking countries had not abandoned the Gothic hand in printing, Gothic also had an effect on their styles.

Rudolf Koch was a friend and younger contemporary of Larisch. Koch's books, type designs, and teaching impacted calligraphy in northern Europe, and later, the United States. Larisch and Koch taught many European calligraphers, notably Karlgeorg Hoefer and Hermann Zapf.

Contemporary typefaces used by computers, from word processors like Microsoft Word or Apple Pages to professional design software packages like Adobe InDesign, find their roots in both the calligraphy of the past as well as several professional typeface designers.

Selected images
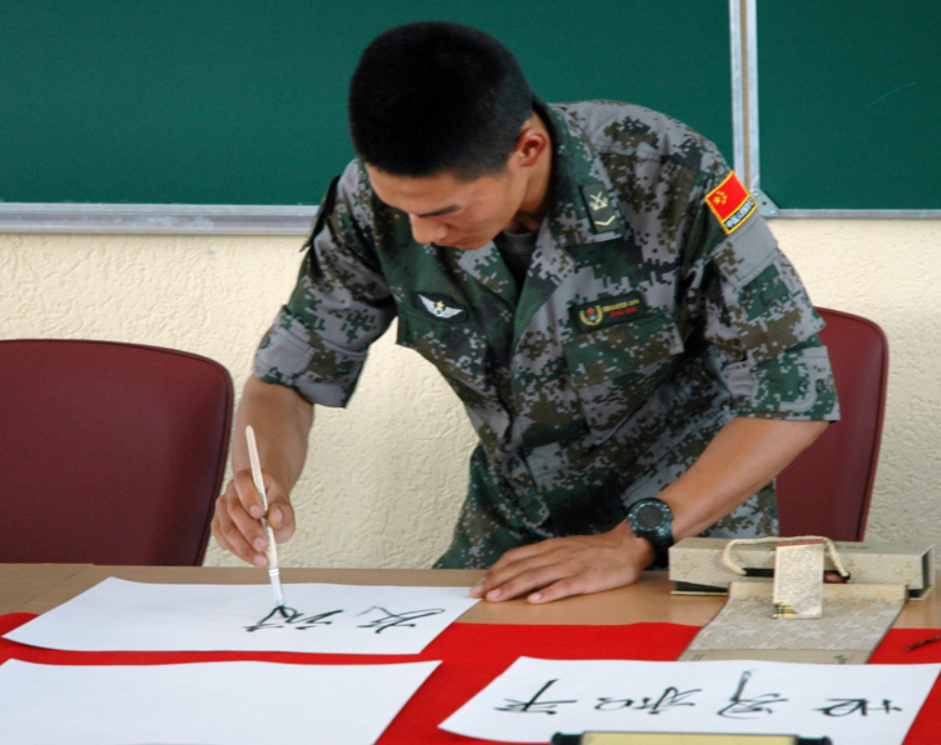
Chinese soldier in calligraphy competition

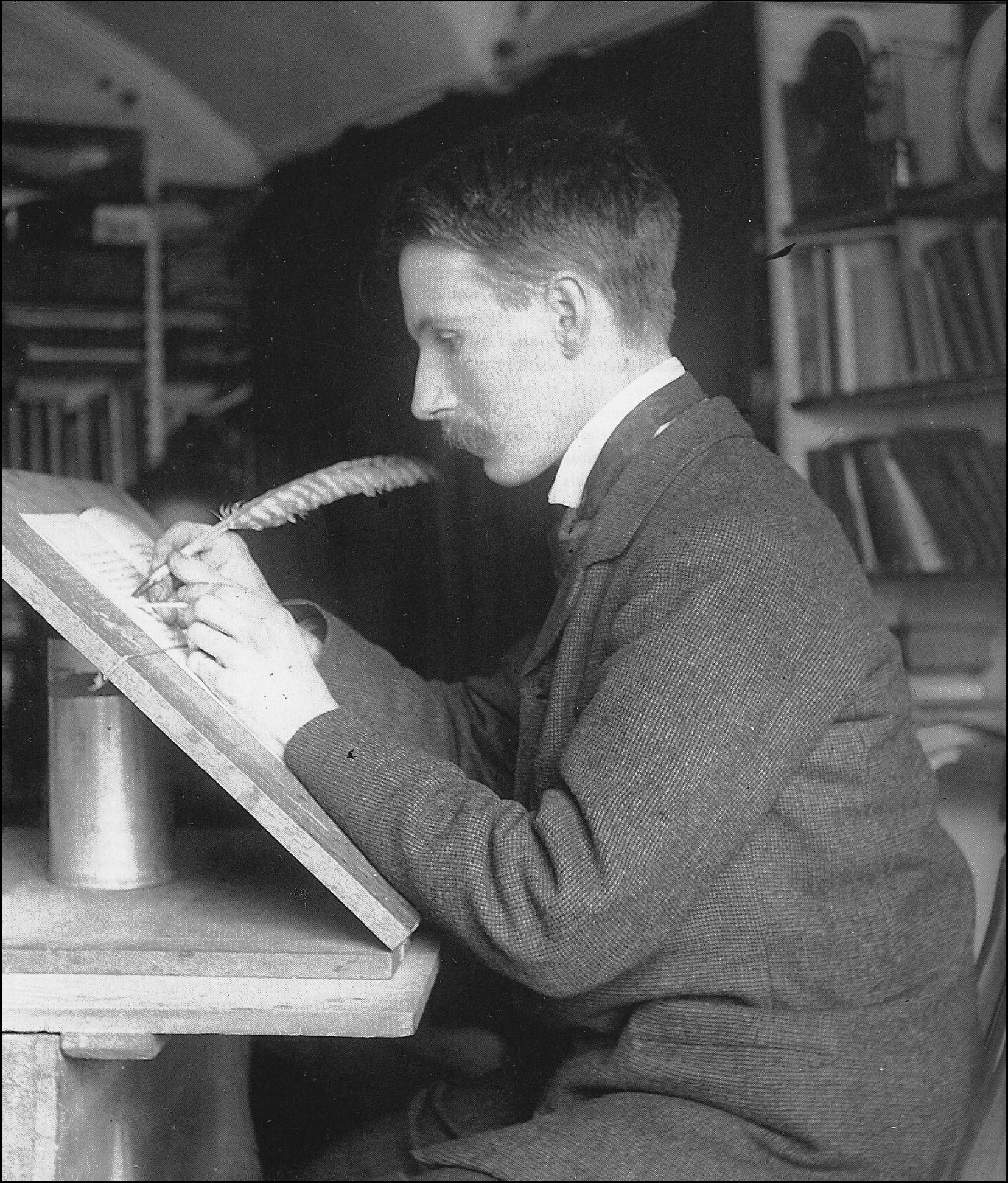
Edward Johnston, a famous British calligrapher, at work in 1902

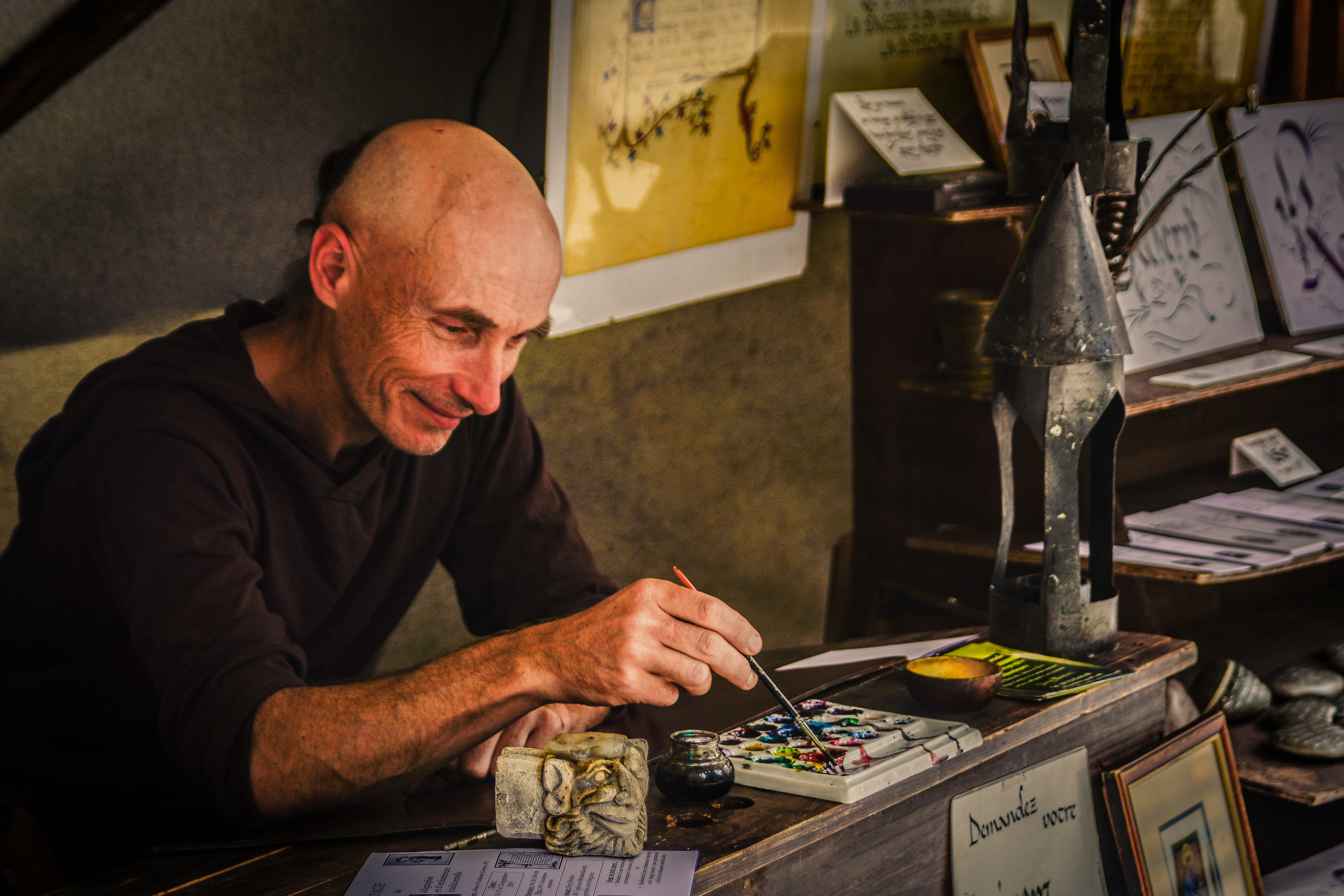
Artisian calligrapher at work in Saint Leonard de Noblat, France

== See also ==
- Handwriting script – Style of handwriting
- Asemic writing – Wordless open semantic form of writing
- Bastarda – Various scripts and typefaces of Renaissance Europe
- Blackletter – Historic European script and typeface
- Book hand – Stylised medieval handwriting style
- Brāhmī script – Ancient script of Central and South Asia
- Calligraffiti – Calligraphy and graffiti art form
- Chancery hand – Two styles of historic handwriting
- Concrete poetry – Movement in art and poetry involving the visual arrangement of language
- Court hand – Handwriting style in medieval English law courts
- Cursive – Style of penmanship
- Handstyle – In graffiti culture, the unique handwriting of an artist
- Handwriting – Writing created by a person with a writing implement
- History of writing
- Italic script – Style of handwriting and calligraphy developed in Italy
- Lettering – Art of drawing letters
- List of calligraphers
- Mathematical Alphanumeric Symbols – Unicode block U+1D400 until U+1D7FF
- Micrography – Art genre using minute Hebrew letters
- Palaeography – Study of historical handwriting and manuscripts
- Penmanship – Technique of writing with the hand
- Ronde script (calligraphy) – Sixteenth-century French script
- Rotunda (script) – Medieval blackletter script
- Round hand – Type of handwriting
- Secretary hand – Style of European handwriting
- Siyah mashq – Calligraphic practice sheets
- Sofer – Jewish scribe
- Tag (graffiti) – Form of graffiti
