= Charles Pearce (calligrapher) =

British calligrapher and painter

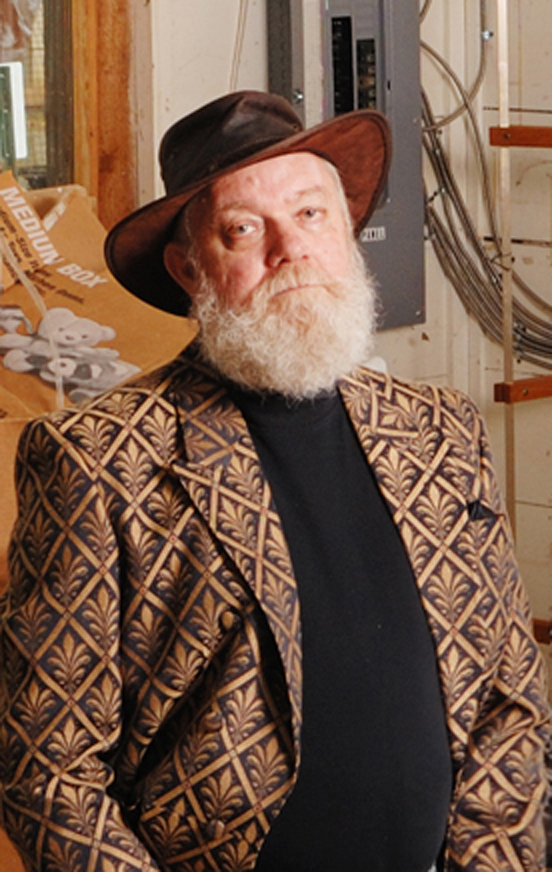
Charles Pearce, Eureka Springs, AR 2011

Charles Pearce (born 1943) is a British calligrapher and painter, known for his work in the art of letterforms. Pearce has made contributions to the fields of calligraphy and fine arts, blending traditional techniques with modern aesthetics, earning him recognition both in the UK and internationally.

Pearce's pieces feature in collections, including those of private collectors. Pearce has authored several manuals and instructional materials on calligraphy.

== Early life and education ==
Boes Rothwell Pearce in Aston, Birmingham, he is the eldest son of Charles Kenneth Rothwell Pearce, an English and Drama teacher, later Headmaster, and Winifred Helen Mary Pearce (née Evans), a concert pianist. He has two brothers, Robert and Julian, and a sister, Barbara.

He studied at Tettenhall College (Wolverhampton), and the Leek School of Arts and Crafts (Leek, Staffordshire). At the Central School of Arts and Crafts (London), he studied with Dorothy Mahoney, William Gardner, and Ann Camp. At the Camberwell School of Arts and Crafts (London, England), he studied under Donald Jackson and Sidney Bendall, graduating with a National Diploma in Design at Special Level in Writing and Illuminating and Lettering.

== Career ==
After graduation Pearce went to work for Decca Records in their Lambeth studio designing record sleeves and promotional literature, and then on to a small advertising agency in the West End of London. He left there to become an assistant to both Donald Jackson and Sidney Bendall. He worked with Bendall for some four years designing and cutting letters in stone and wood, but remained with Jackson for almost fifteen years, through 1979.

In 1971 he was made a Fellow of the Society of Scribes & Illuminators. Pearce and Jackson worked on many commissions which came into Jackson's studio. One included a huge family tree which measured 8ft by 4ft, and was a large board covered with a cowhide which had been prepared as for vellum. A large amount of his time during this period was involved in the design and signage for Cranks Health Foods until they were taken over by Guinness.

In 1980, Pearce relocated to New York City for work. While living in New York he primarily worked for two major clients: Pentalic Corporation and RKO Century Warner Theaters. It was during this time that he was awarded artist in residence status by the City, which thus allowed him to convert loft space into a working studio.

Pearce relocated again to Cleveland in 1991 and worked in the American Greetings design studios for almost ten years, during which he was trained in the use of computer technology. He finally left to go back to working freelance and was granted a contract by AG for 16 months to give him the opportunity to work his way back into that market.

== Freelance work ==
Pearce began to use brushes on canvas rather than pens and paper which gave him the opportunity to work considerably larger than previously. He has used a technique which involves the throwing of paint onto raw canvas, to create the start of his paintings. He then stretches the canvas onto frames/stretchers which he has designed specially to take the force of stretching the canvas, which doesn't involve any cross-bracing. His largest single canvas to date measures 5 ft by 9 ft.

It was on a visit back to Eureka Springs, Arkansas, where he had taught a workshop back in 1988, that he realised he no longer needed to live in Cleveland and could, in fact, do something which he had wanted to do for much of his life: live in the country. In late 2000 he bought 12 acres just outside Eureka Springs and began work on designing and constructing a studio in which he could also live. Whiskey Spring Studio was completed in 2003.

While no longer a member of the Eureka Fine Art Gallery, he continues to paint in his studio, expanding the use of calligraphy in abstract paintings. He also works occasionally with John Robert Willer, another Arkansas painter, with whom he has been creating a series of Ozark paintings which they call the "Blue Grass Series".

== Personal life ==
In 1966, he married Linda Margaret (née Cook), and lived for three years in Palmers Green, London, before moving to Hertford in 1969 and then to Ware, Hertfordshire. They have three sons, Mark (b.1967), Aaron (b.1972) and Daniel (b.1977). Pearce and his wife were divorced in 1979.

== Publications ==
- Pearce, Charles (1981). The Little Manual of Calligraphy. Taplinger/Harper Collins. ISBN 978-0-8008-4923-8.
- —— (1981). A Calligraphy Manual for the Beginner. Pentalic. ASIN B0007AY7WK.
- —— (1981). The Pentalic Calligraphy Kit for the Beginner. Pentalic. ASIN B0018BGKYU.
- —— (1985). The Calligraphy Sampler. HarperCollins. ISBN 978-0-00-411909-0.
- —— (1987). The Anatomy of Letters. Taplinger. ISBN 978-0-8008-0199-1.

== Exhibitions ==
=== One man shows ===
- 1986 New School Gallery, New York City.
- 1990 Fedano's Gallery, New York City.
- 1996 Servi Textus, St. John's University, Collegeville, MN.
- 2004 University of Arkansas, Pine Bluff.
- 2005 Performing Arts Center Gallery, Subiaco Abbey, Paris, AR.
- 2005 Community First Bank Gallery, Eureka Springs, AR.
- 2006 EureKan Art, Eureka Springs, AR.
- 2010 Expressions of Shakespeare, Quincy Arts Center, Quincy, IL.
- 2010 The Painted Word, John Brown University, Siloam Springs, AR.
- 2011 Calligraphic Abstractions, The Laman Library, North Little Rock, AR.
- 2011 Recent Work, Ozark Center for the Arts, Springdale, AR.

=== Group shows ===
- 1998 Celebrating American Poetry, Frye Art Museum, Seattle, WA.
- 1999 Twentieth Century Calligraphy, AIGA Gallery, New York, NY.
- 2001 Two man show with Mark Mueller, American Greetings Gallery, Cleveland, OH.
- 2001 Cleveland Biennial Juried Art Show, Cleveland State University Gallery, Cleveland, OH.
- 2006 Faculty exhibit, Black and White Conference, Issaquah, WA.
- 2006 Faculty exhibit, Letterforum, James Madison University, VA.
- 2008 Faculty exhibit, Letters Mingle Souls, Chicago, IL.
- 2009 Faculty exhibit, The Calligraphy Connection, Collegeville, MN.
- 2011 Artists In Situ, six artists in three venues, Eureka Springs, AR.
