= Graily Hewitt =

British writer and calligrapher

William Graily Hewit or Graily Hewitt (1864–1952) was a British calligrapher and novelist who played a key role in the revival of calligraphy in England in the early 20th century, alongside Edward Johnston.

== Biography ==
Hewitt was educated at Westminster School and Trinity College, Cambridge. First training as a lawyer, he interrupted his career to write a novel and a volume of short stories. He later attended Edward Johnston's evening classes at the Central School of Arts and Crafts and quickly became a teacher there, and at the Camberwell School of Art, taking up Johnston's previous work. Hewitt remained at the Central School until the 1920s and 1930s, publishing together with Johnston throughout the early part of the century and working with a series of other illuminators over the decades.

Hewitt was central to the revival of gilding in calligraphy, and his prolific output on type design also appeared between 1915 and 1943. His contributions to Writing, Illuminating and Lettering and his guide Lettering for Students & Craftsmen (1930) are considered particularly crucial to the revival of gilding. He is credited with the revival of gilding with gesso and gold leaf on vellum. Elements of Hewitt's work are included in a variety of manuscript books. He was one of the initiators of the Society of Scribes and Illuminators, in 1921.

Hewitt sought to link calligraphy and type design, arguing that type should represent creations of pen. The Treyford Type, employed for The Pen and Type Design, was a design of Hewitt's. He also created a series of initials for St. John Hornby's Ashendene Press, during the long period 1902 to 1935. He continued calligraphy up to his death on 22 December 1952 aged 88.

His work is kept in the Victoria and Albert Museum's collection. His pupils included Percy Delf Smith, who he recommended to take over his teaching position at Camberwell.

== Works ==
- Hewitt, Graily, Lettering for Students & Craftsmen (1930).
