= Donald Jackson (calligrapher) =

British calligrapher (born 1938)

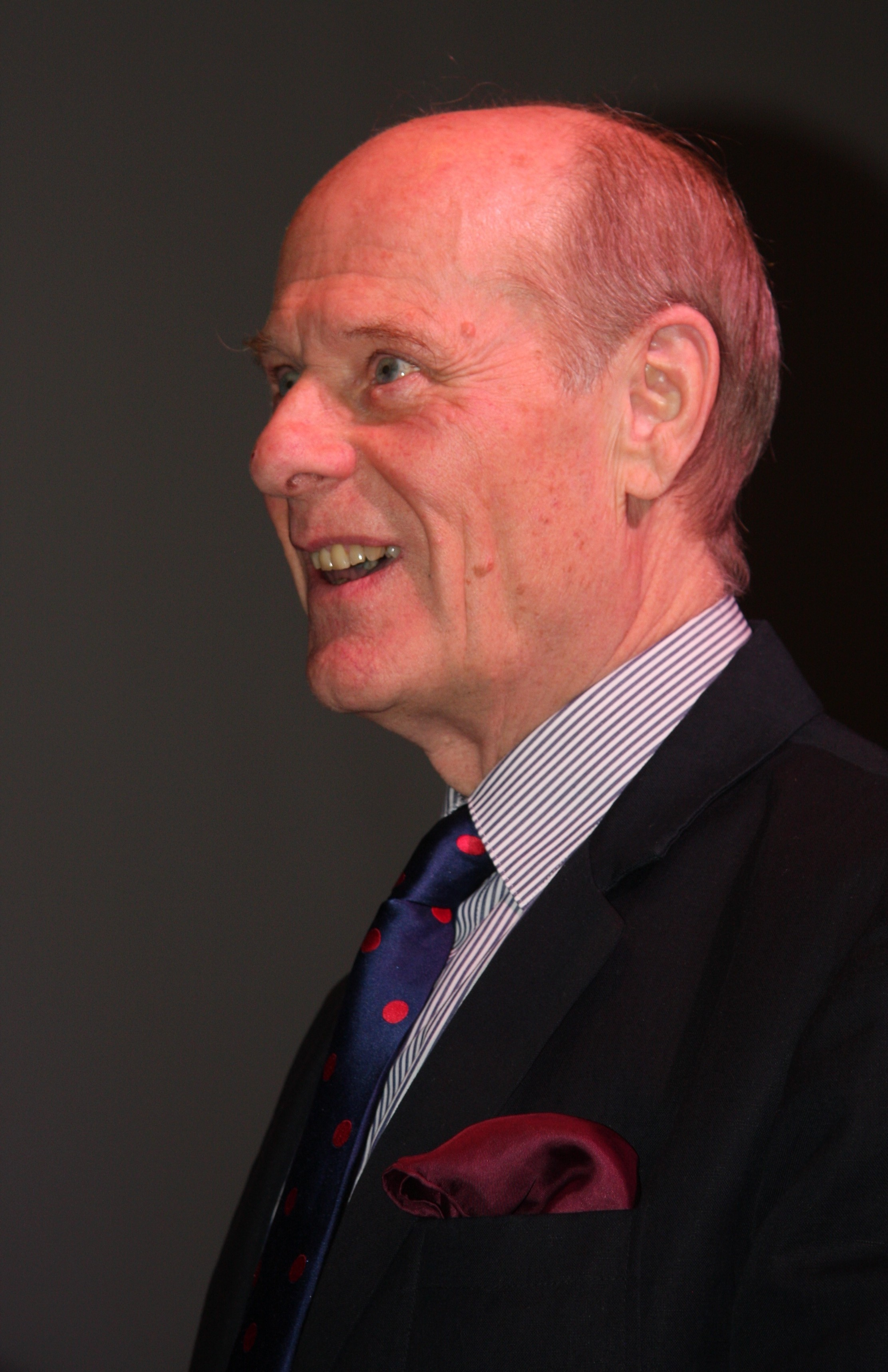
Jackson in 2015

Donald Jackson (born 14 January 1938, Lancashire, England) is a British calligrapher and official scribe to the Crown Office. Jackson is artistic director of The Saint John's Bible, a hand-written and illuminated Bible commissioned by the Benedictine monastery of Saint John's Abbey in Collegeville, Minnesota, United States of America. He is the author of The Story of Writing and The Calligrapher's Art.
