= English script (calligraphy) =

Cursive writing style which first emerged in 18th century England

English script is a cursive style, used especially for capital letters, which first emerged in 18th century England.

== See also ==
- Western calligraphy
