= Abstrusa Glossary =

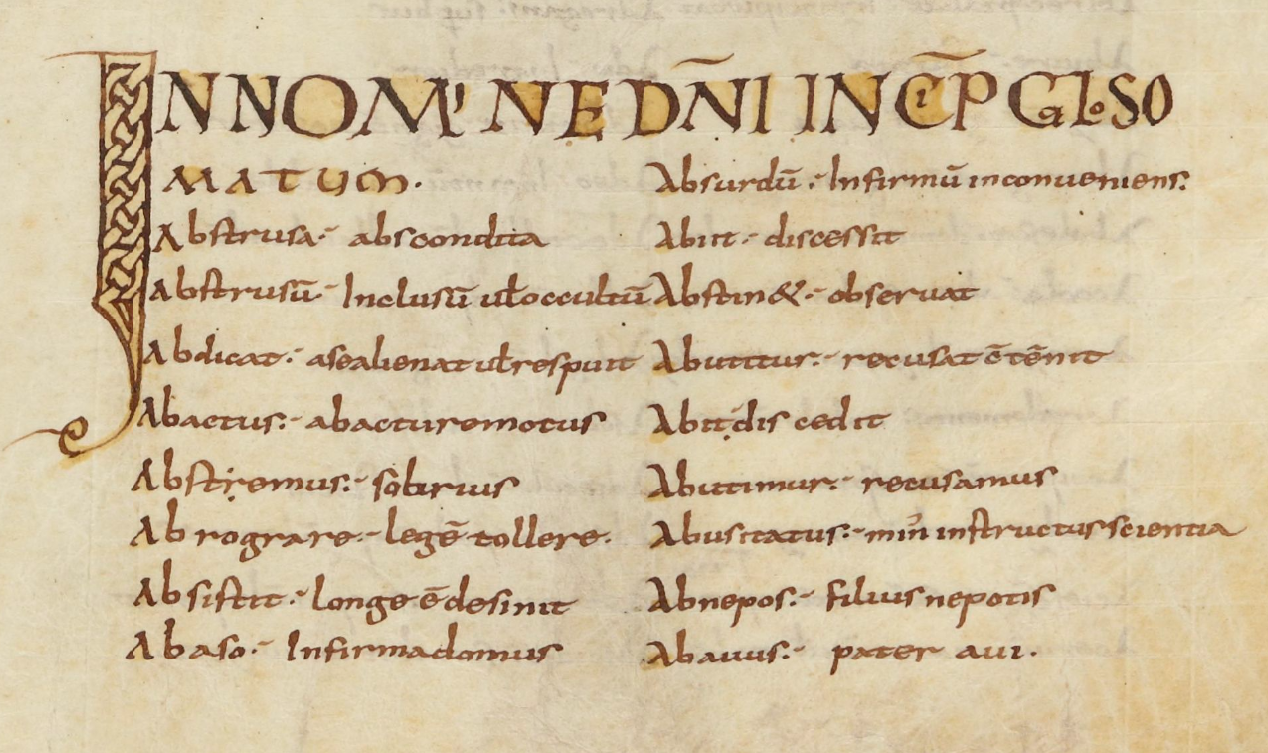
Start of the glossary in Paris lat. 2341 reads In nomine domini incipit glosomatum (In the name of the Lord, here begins the glossary), followed by the first entry (abstrusa ... abscondita). Copy from the 9th century.

The Abstrusa Glossary is a glossary of Latin from the 7th or 8th century AD. Typical of such glossaries, it is named after its first lemma, abstrusa.

The Abstrusa was probably compiled in Gaul, possibly in Aquitaine, since the compiler provides Gaulish uerna as a vernacular translation of Latin alnus. It is alphabetized to the third letter (i.e., ABC stage), indicating an organized, stable composition.

The Abstrusa can be found in five manuscripts and one fragment. In the oldest of these (Vatican lat. 3321), probably copied in central Italy in the 8th century, it is accompanied by the Abolita Glossary. The same two glossaries are found together in a 10th-century manuscript from Monte Cassino (Cass. 439), which originated in Spain. Although they appear together, the two glossaries are distinct, making use of different sources and containing different definitions. The Abstrusa is transmitted separately in two manuscripts in the Bibliothèque Nationale de France (Paris lat. 7691 and lat. 2341). Both are written in Caroline minuscule. Paris lat. 7691 was copied at Reims in the 9th century. A further copy is found in Vatican lat. 6018. There is a 9th-century fragment (Berne A 92, fr. iii) in Visigothic minuscule, probably from Aquitaine. Finally, the Second Amplonian Glossary contains entries clearly borrowed from the Abstrusa, but from a manuscript with variants not found in surviving copies.

The main sources of Abstrusa are marginal scholia (explanations of the difficult words) found in copies of the Bible and the works of Virgil. Some of the glosses can be traced to the Virgilian commentaries of Aelius Donatus (and to a lesser extent Servius) and the Appendix Vergiliana, but not to the commentaries of Festus (in contrast to the Abolita).

The Abstrusa seems to have been used by the author of the Proverbia Grecorum, probably writing in Ireland in the 7th or 8th century. It was a major source for the 9th-century Liber glossarum. The original version of the Abstrusa may have been longer than any surviving copy, since its glosses in the Liber are often longer, suggesting that in its independent transmission it was frequently shortened.

== Editions ==
- Lindsay, W. M.; Thomson, H. J., eds. (1926). "Abstrusa". Glossaria Latina iussu Academiae Britannicae edita. Vol. 3. Paris: Société Anonyme d'Édition "Les Belles Lettres". pp. 1–90.
