= Liber glossarum =

Medieval Latin glossary

The Liber glossarum (also called the Glossarium Ansileubi) is an enormous compendium of knowledge used for later compilations during the Middle Ages, and a general reference work used by contemporary scholars. It is the first Latin encyclopedia whose items are alphabetically ordered. It has alternatively been referred to as an encyclopedia, a glossary, and a dictionary.

The earliest copies of the Liber glossarum were written in the ab-type script of Corbie and in Carolingian minuscule and for this reason it has been said that the work was most likely created at the monastery of Corbie or at a nearby nunnery during the time of the abbot Adalhard (780-814; 821-826). Adalhard was the cousin of Charlemagne, and given the immense nature of the project, it is likely that the creation of the Liber glossarum enjoyed support from Carolingian rulers, including Charlemagne himself.

Among the main sources for the Liber is the Abstrusa Glossary. It in turn was the main source of Papias, it was used by Italian humanists in Florence, and later it was referenced until the seventeenth century.

== Background ==
It has been said that the Liber glossarum was part of a larger effort by the Carolingian emperors and especially Charlemagne to reform the areas of religion, royal administration, monastic organizations, and language. These reforms were aimed heavily at creating objective standards throughout the Frankish kingdoms. The "Carolingian Renaissance" refers specifically to "the burgeoning of intellectual and cultural life" during the eighth and ninth centuries in what is now modern France. Approximately 7000 Latin manuscripts survive from the ninth century while only 2000 survive from the period covering the fifth to the eighth centuries. The production and preservation of so many manuscripts is indicative of the cultural and intellectual blossoming of the period. This renaissance drew on centers of culture and lines of development which were established in Western Europe during previous centuries. The Carolingian dynasty supported a flowering of intellectual life with royal resources. They directed it and could take much of the credit for its success. The Carolingian royalty supported this intellectual growth for two reasons: a general appreciation of the pursuit of knowledge and a desire to properly standardize religious life and prayer.

== Organization ==
Using the Liber glossarum, a medieval scholar was able to look up the meaning of an individual word and find numerous synonyms. Such a scholar could also study information about a specific topic. Most copies of the Liber glossarum were organized into hundreds of pages each containing upwards of 40 lines of written text. Each column contained alphabetized entries of individual words and their respective definitions.

== Manuscripts ==
Known copies of the Liber glossarum are mostly scattered throughout France and Germany.

A near complete copy of the manuscript is located in Paris. One two-sided manuscript leaf is held at Dartmouth College in New Hampshire.
