= Proverbia Grecorum =

7th-8th century Latin collection of proverbs

Four Proverbia Grecorum quoted in the Pseudo-Augustinian Liber de divinis scripturis (Munich, Clm. 14096)

The Proverbia Grecorum (sometimes Parabolae Gregorum, both meaning "proverbs of the Greeks") is an anonymous Latin collection of proverbs compiled in the seventh or eighth century AD in the British Isles, probably in Ireland. Despite the name, it has no known Greek source. It was perhaps designed as a secular complement to the Hebrew Bible's Book of Proverbs.

Within about a century of its composition, the Proverbia was being copied in northern Italy, yet all surviving manuscripts have an Anglo-Saxon or Celtic connection. Only one complete copy survives, but excerpts (with citations) are found in at least eight other manuscripts. There are seventy-four proverbs, but seven others with no connection to the original work are erroneously attributed to it in various manuscripts.

== Transmission ==
=== Sedulius Scottus ===
The original compilation consisted of 74 short proverbs and a prefatory letter. There is one surviving copy of the complete work on folio 246^{r–v} of the manuscript Kues 52 (now in St. Nikolaus-Hospital in Bernkastel-Kues), where it is part of the Collectaneum of Sedulius Scottus. This manuscript was copied in the Abbey of Saints Eucherius and Matthias in Trier in the twelfth century.

Sedulius quotes from the Proverbia in several other works. In the same copy of the Collectaneum, there is a florilegium containing 40 statements on virtues and vices, five of which are drawn from the Proverbia without citation. Sedulius quotes proverb 68 in his In Donati artem minorem (again without citing the original collection) and several statements closing paralleling the Proverbia can be found in his De rectoribus Christianis. Among his excerpts of Lactantius' Divinae institutiones (found in the Kues manuscript), he includes a statement that is not attributable to Lactantius nor is found in the Proverbia but which is derived from Rufinus' translation of Origen's Homily on Genesis. Since this statement came to be attributed to the Proverbia in other works, it provides the only known connection between the Proverbia and an actual Greek work, in this case one of the Greek Fathers. The attribution of this statement to the Proverbia, however, was made in error and it was not part of the original collection.

=== Other manuscripts ===
Besides the works in the Kues manuscript, several other works quote select proverbs attributed to the Proverbia Grecorum. Ten excerpts from the Proverbia along with some Old Irish glosses are found on page 61 of Milan, Ambrosianus F 60 sup, a manuscript from Bobbio Abbey. The main work in this manuscript, Excerpta ex patribus, was probably copied in Ireland in the eighth century before the manuscript was brought to Bobbio, where the proverbs were added. The ten excerpts rely on a different model than that copied by Sedulius. Wallace Lindsay published the Bobbio excerpts and glosses in 1910.

There are also a number of proverbs cited to the Proverbia that are not found among the original 74 of the Kues manuscript and were, like the quotation from Origen, misattributed to the Proverbia at a later date. Some of these later misattributed proverbs are derived from Sedulius' De rectoribus Christianis.

Three proverbs attributed to the Proverbia Grecorum but which were not part of the original collection (Cambridge, CCC 415)

Ten proverbs attributed to the Proverbia are found on pages 195–199 of the so-called Norman Anonymous (shelfmark Cambridge, CCC 415) under the title De nomine regni. This was copied in the eleventh or twelfth century in Normandy. Only six of the proverbs quoted actually belong to the original Proverbia collection. One of them that does not is also quoted by the Anglo-Saxon Cathwulf in his letter to Charlemagne around 775. Two Breton manuscripts contain the same six Proverbia as CCC 415. One was created in Brittany, (Note: Paris, Bibliothèque Nationale de France, lat. 3182, pp. 303–304 (9th century)) the other at Fécamp Abbey by a Breton scribe named Maeloc. (Note: Cambrai, Bibliothèque Municipale, MS 625 (576), fols. 68^{v}–69^{r} (10th century)) These three manuscripts—and the theme of the proverbs they contain—suggest a common source in the form of a collection of sententiae on kingship drawn from the Proverbia and from the chapter "De regno" of the Irish Collectio canonum Hibernensis. This hypothetical lost work may have been brought to the continent during the English Benedictine Reform in the 10th century.

Four manuscripts of the Collectio canonum Hibernensis also contain citations of the Proverbia Grecorum. The original "A" recension of this collection of canon law was compiled in Ireland before 725 with the proverbs, but the editors who created the expanded "B" recension incorporated six proverbs attributed to the Proverbia Grecorum. Only four of these, however, actually belong to the original Proverbia. Three copies (Note: Oxford, Bodleian, Hatton 42 (9th century, Brittany) Rome, Vallicelliana 17 (10th or 11th century, Italy, probably the south) London, British Library, Cotton Otho E XIII (9th or 10th century, Brittany)) of the "B" recension contain all six, while a single late copy (Note: Karlsruhe, Augiensis 18 (9th century)) of the "A" recension updated with some material from "B" includes one proverb.

Four proverbs cited to the Proverbia are quoted on folio 63^{v} of the manuscript Munich, Clm. 14096 as additions to a copy of the Pseudo-Augustinian Liber de divinis scripturis. One of these is genuine, but another is in fact a quotation from the prefatory letter. The other two are not from the original Proverbia: one is from Ecclesiasticus 11:2–3 (Note: The Latin here does not derive from the Vulgate.) and the other is from the Florilegium frisingense. The manuscript dates to the early ninth century and is of Celtic origin, possibly Irish or Breton, but more likely originating in Wales or Cornwall.

=== Circulation ===
All surviving copies of the Proverbia have an insular connection and its circulation, even on the continent, seems to have been limited to insular scholars.

Evidence for the circulation of the Proverbia Grecorum in Ireland can be found in the tenth-century poem Saltair na Rann, which has text paralleling proverb 52. This same text is excerpted in the prologue to the Senchas Már. A later commentary on the Senchas Már includes a part of proverb 10 with an Irish translation.

The Proverbia were also known in Wales. Asser in his biography of Alfred the Great quotes proverb 20 and possibly several others. He may have laid out Alfred's virtues as king in parallel with the proverb of the eight columns, the same one quoted by Cathwulf. The colloquy De raris fabulis, probably written in Wales or possibly Cornwall, quotes proverb 14. This tradition may depend upon Sedulius.

A possible lost manuscript of the Proverbia may be recorded in the twelfth-century catalogue of the library of Lincoln Cathedral, which mentions a Librum Prouerbium Graecorum inutilem, a useless book of Greek proverbs.

== Date ==
The Bobbio manuscript provides the earliest evidence for the Proverbia and puts the terminus ante quem of the collection in the eighth century. It was probably compiled in the late seventh or early eighth century, judging from the style of the prefatory letter. Sigmund Hellmann, the first editor of the collection, concluded that the Proverbia might have been a translation from a Greek original produced in Ireland in the seventh century. The evidence, however, points to a Latin origin. The Latinity of the letter is superior to that of the proverbs, which indicates an earlier date for them than the collection as a whole, probably the sixth century.

== Authorship ==
Proverbia 63 and 64 in a Breton manuscript (BNF, lat. 3182). The rubric reads De distantia regni iniqui et iusti Greci in proverbiis proferunt ("On the difference between an unjust and a just kingdom the Greeks proffer proverbs").

The prefatory letter was once thought to have been written by Sedulius, but the discovery of excerpts from it in the Bobbio manuscript makes this chronologically impossible. The author of the letter and the compiler of the collection are one and the same. The title of the work, Proverbia Grecorum, is his coining. In the letter, he does not claim to have translated his proverbs or taken them from a larger collection, but to have collected them with "unceasing labour". (Note: Haec labore sollicito congregare uolumus.) He does not name his addressee, but he advises studying the proverbs alongside the Bible to avoid falling into heresy. His Latinity is good, there is evidence of familiarity with rhetoric and he had a biblical and, to a lesser extent, classical education.

The author may have been Irish. Two of his proverbs (61 and 69) may have their origin in early Irish law. The language used for monasticism—calling a student lector and a monastery civitas—is distinctly Irish. The prose style of the work is Hiberno-Latin.

== Sources ==
Despite the title, none of the proverbs in the original collection can be shown to have a Greek origin. One (39) does quote three words of Latinized Greek, (Note: in scenis diceon (ἐν σκηναῗς δικαίων), "in the tents of the righteous") but these come from Psalm 118:15, the Greek of which was known in Ireland. In the prefatory letter, the author claims to have gotten his material "from the wisdom of the Greeks", (Note: de prudentia Grecorum) which may be little more than an idle boast intended to enhance the prestige of the collection.

The vocabulary of the Proverbia suggests the influence of the Vulgate Proverbia Salomonis. There are, however, many unusual words only some of which can be explained by reference to then existing glossaries, such as the Abstrusa Glossary and the Corpus Glossary. The title Proverbia Grecorum may be intended to imply that the collection is the secular complement of the Proverbia Salomonis.

== Examples of proverbs ==
There were 74 proverbs in the original collection. Another 8 are attributed to the collection in various sources, including one that is in fact an excerpt of the prefatory letter of the original collection. The following are select translations:

20. Super modicum fundamentum iustus edificat et, per tempora crescens, sicut granum sinapis, incrementum dat. [The just man builds on a modest foundation and growing in time like a grain of mustard seed gives the increase.]

25. Similis est piger foratorio quod nihil boni facere potest nisi malleo percussum fuerit. [A sluggard is like a chisel, useless until hammered.]

26. Prudens prudentes in consilium uocat et sine eorum consilio nihil facit. Stultus uero in semet ipso cogitat et quod sine consilio aliorum cito uult facit. [A wise man summons wise men to council and does nothing without their advice. But a fool keeps his own counsel and does what he wants on the spur of the moment without anyone's advice.]

40. Tres bacheriosi, <id est>, terribles, sunt: bellator armatus promptusque ad prelium, leo de spelunca quando predam devorat, aper ferus de silua quando furore in aliquem irruit. [Three ... are terrible: the armed warrior eager for battle; the lion from the cave, when he devours his prey; the wild boar from the wood when he rages against somebody.]

43. Rex pacificus leta facie bona diuidit et uniuscuiusque causam diligenter meditatur, etiam infirmos et pauperes populi non despiciens. [The peaceful king distributes bounty with a cheerful countenance and diligently considers every petition, not scorning even the sick and poor among the people.]

In Dean Simpson's edition, the proverbs that are not part of the original collection but that came to be attributed to it are proverbs 1 and 2 in the Hatton manuscript, proverbs 1–3 in the Munich manuscript and proverbs 1–3 and 5 in the Cambridge manuscript. Hatton 1 and Cambridge 1 are the same—a proverb on the five periods of kingship also found in the Karlsruhe manuscript and in Sedulius' De rectoribus Christianis—while Munich 3 is an extract from the original prefatory letter.

Hatton 2 is the proverb derived from Origen about the six ways the human soul is made in the image of God. Cambridge 2, on the eight columns of the just king's kingdom, is the proverb quoted by Cathwulf and is also found in Sedulius' De rectoribus Christianis. Anton Scharer translates it thus:

2. Item in Prouerbiis Grecorum: Octo columpnae sunt quae fortiter regnum iusti regis sufferunt. Prima columpna ueritas est in omnibus rebus regalibus, secunda columpna patientia in omni negotio, tertia largitas in muneribus, quarta persuadibilitas in uerbis, quinta malorum correctio atque contritio, sexta bonorum exaltatio atque eleuatio, septima leuitas tributi in populis, octaua aequitas iudicii inter diuitem et pauperem. [Likewise in the proverbs of the Greeks: Eight are the columns that strongly support the kingdom of the just king. The first column is truth in all royal activities, the second column patience in all business, the third munificence in gifts, the fourth persuasiveness and affability in words, the fifth reproof of and grief about the wicked, the sixth friendship and exaltation of the good, the seventh the lightness of tribute imposed on the people, the eighth equity in judgement between rich and poor.]

Munich 1, concerning the wise bee, may be derived from the 7th-century Vita Eligii of Audoin. It was also known to Asser.

Ut appis prudentissima, quae congregat de omnibus floribus totius terrae in vas suum, ut reges et sacerdotes comedant de fructu dulcissimo laboris illius, sicut scriptum est in Proverbiis Gregorum: non spernas hominem in visu neque despicias staturam eius; brevis est enim apis in volatilibus caeli et fructum illius primatus dulcidinis. [Like the most clever bee which collects from all the flowers of the entire earth in her hive so that kings and priests may taste the sweet produce of her labours; as is written in the proverbs of the Greeks: ‘Do not spurn man in his aspect nor despise his stature; short is the bee among the birds of heaven and yet her produce holds the first place in sweetness’.]
