= Cusanusstift =

Building in Bernkastel-Kues, Germany

Coordinates: 49°54′58″N 7°04′16″E

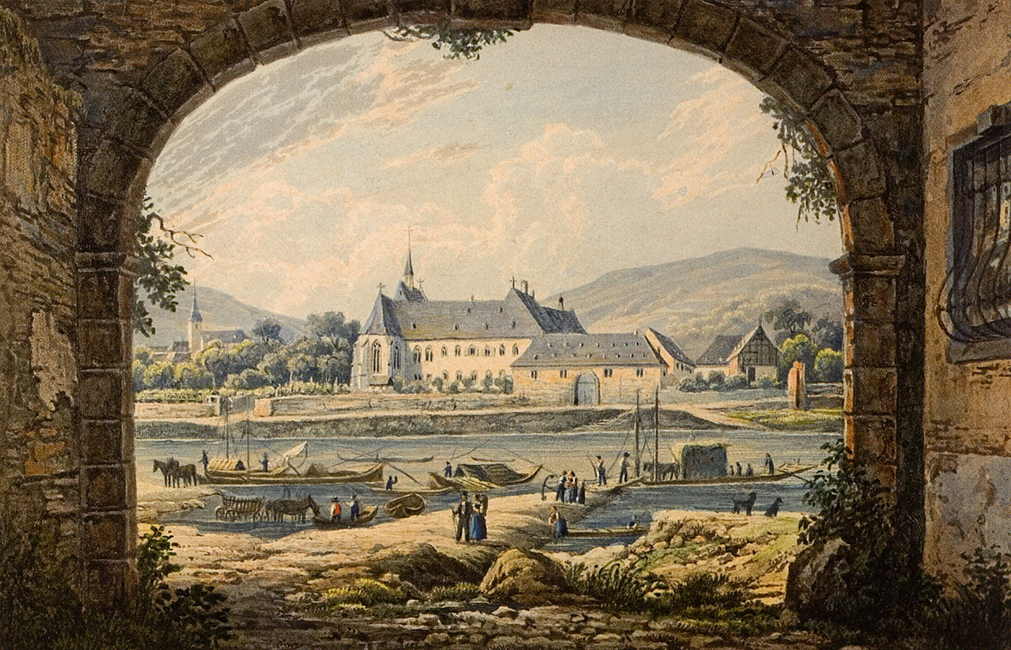
The Cusanusstift in Bernkastel-Kues 1831, located on the Middle Moselle river in the district of Bernkastel-Wittlich, in Rhineland-Palatinate, Germany; aquatint engraving by F. Hegi after Karl Bodmer, hand-colored

The Cusanusstift (St. Nikolaus-Hospital) is a historic building in Bernkastel-Kues, Germany. It was founded by Nicholas of Cusa in 1458. It contains a world-famous library and a wine museum.

Manuscript 52 in its library contains the only complete copy of the Proverbia Grecorum.
