= Visigothic script =

Type of medieval script

Visigothic littera mozarabica, littera toletana
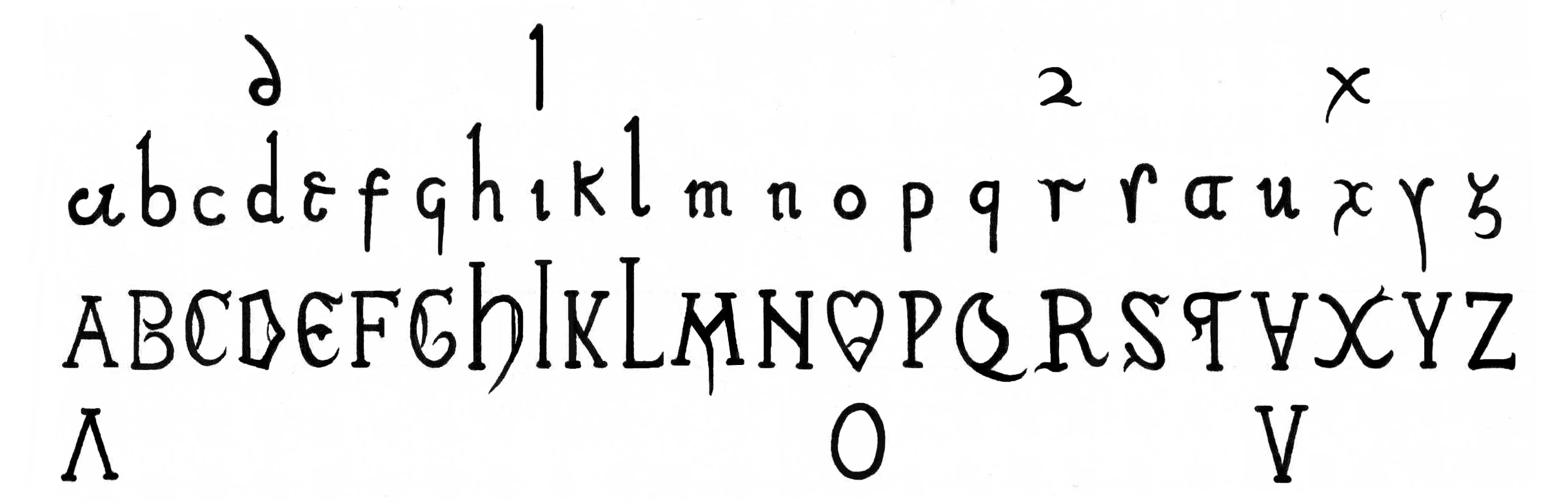
- Alphabet in Visigothic script
- Script type: Alphabetic
- Period: 7th century to 13th century
- Direction: Left to right
- Region: Iberian Peninsula
- Languages: Medieval Latin

Related scripts
- Parent systems: Latin: Uncial; Visigothic
- Sister systems: Beneventan, Merovingian

The Visigothic script was a medieval script that originated in the Visigothic Kingdom in Hispania (the Iberian Peninsula). Its more limiting alternative designations littera toletana and littera mozarabica associate it with scriptoria specifically in Toledo and with Mozarabic culture more generally, respectively.

The script, which exists in book-hand and cursive versions, was used from approximately the late seventh century until the thirteenth century, mostly in Visigothic Iberia but also somewhat in the Catalan kingdom in current southern France. It was perfected in the 9th–11th centuries and declined afterwards. It developed from the late Roman cursive, uncial and half-uncial scripts, and shares many features of uncial, especially the form of the letter ⟨g⟩.

Evolution from Visigothic Zet ⟨Ꝣ⟩ to modern ⟨Ç⟩

Other features of the script include an open-top ⟨a⟩ (very similar to the letter ⟨u⟩), similar shapes for the letters ⟨r⟩ and ⟨s⟩, and a long letter ⟨i⟩ resembling the modern letter ⟨l⟩. There are two forms of the letter ⟨d⟩, one with a straight vertical ascender and another with an ascender slanting towards the left. The top stroke of the letter ⟨t⟩, by itself, has a hook curving to the left; ⟨t⟩ also has a number of other forms when used in ligatures, and there are two different ligatures for the two sounds of ⟨ti⟩ (“hard” or unassibilated and "soft" or sibilated) as spoken in Hispano-Latin during this period. The letters ⟨e⟩ and ⟨r⟩ also have many different forms when written in ligature. Of particular interest is the special Visigothic z ⟨ꝣ⟩, which, after adoption into Carolingian handwriting, eventually transformed into the c-cedilla ⟨ç⟩.

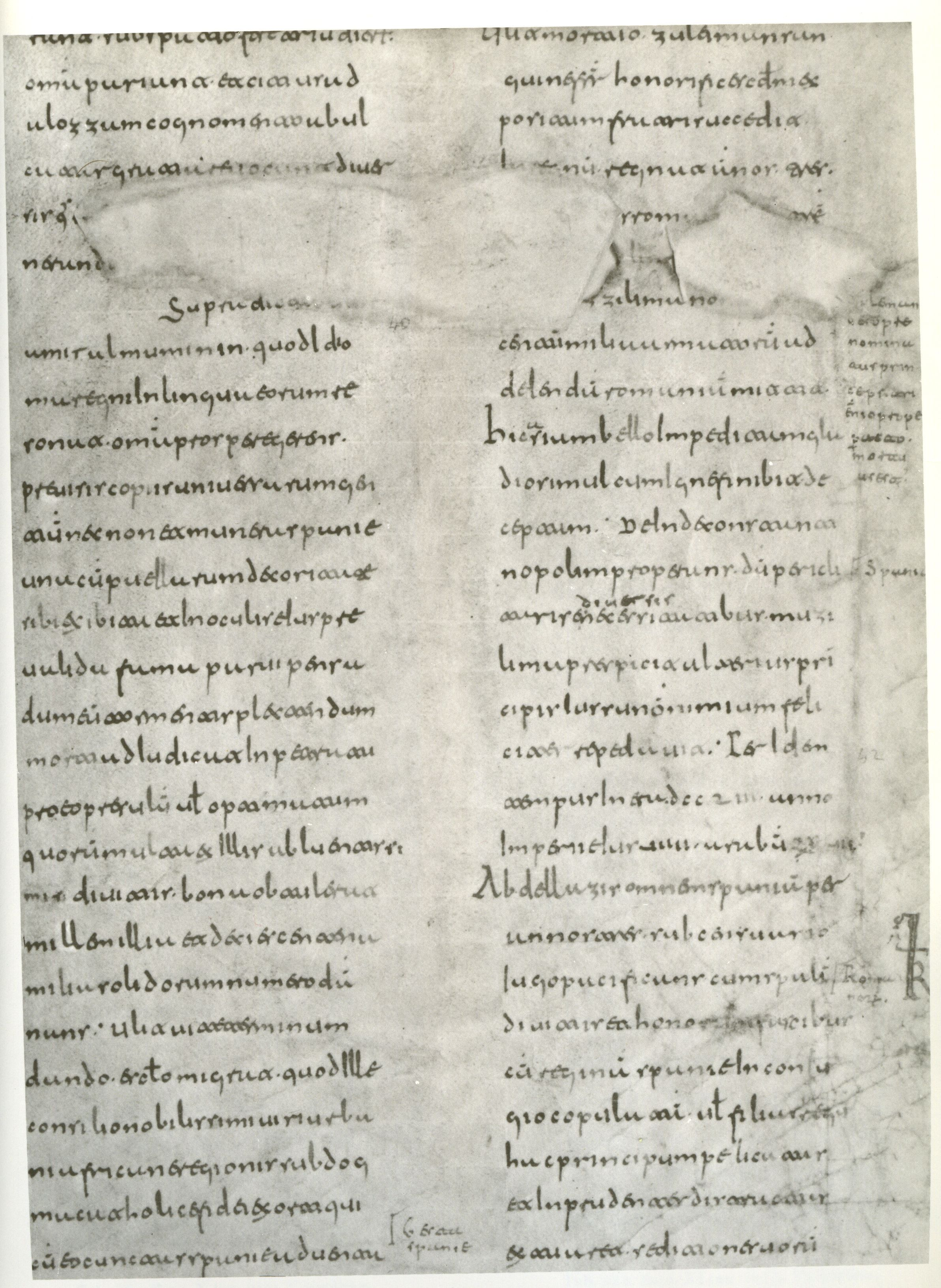
Folio 2r of the Chronicle of 754

A capital-letter display script was developed from the standard script, with long slender forms. There was also a cursive form that was used for charters and non-religious writings, which had northern ("Leonese") and southern ("Mozarabic") forms. The Leonese cursive was used in the Christian north, and the Mozarabic was used by Christians living in the Muslim south. The cursive forms were probably influenced by Roman cursive, brought to Iberia from North Africa.

Visigothic script has many similarities with Beneventan script and Merovingian script.

Character information
Preview	Ꝣ		ꝣ		Ç		ç	
Unicode name	LATIN CAPITAL LETTER VISIGOTHIC Z		LATIN SMALL LETTER VISIGOTHIC Z		LATIN CAPITAL LETTER C WITH CEDILLA		LATIN SMALL LETTER C WITH CEDILLA	
Encodings	decimal	hex	dec	hex	dec	hex	dec	hex
Unicode	42850	U+A762	42851	U+A763	199	U+00C7	231	U+00E7
UTF-8	234 157 162	EA 9D A2	234 157 163	EA 9D A3	195 135	C3 87	195 167	C3 A7
Numeric character reference	&#42850;	&#xA762;	&#42851;	&#xA763;	&#199;	&#xC7;	&#231;	&#xE7;
Named character reference					&Ccedil;		&ccedil;	

== See also ==
- Verona Orational
