= Privy Council of Württemberg =

The Privy Council of Württemberg existed in Württemberg until 1805 and, again, in a renewed form from 1816. In the Holy Roman Empire, there was a college of councils in many territories, which were directly subordinate to the sovereign and under whose chairmanship the affairs of the country were discussed, in particular about the enactment of laws and regulations. The fact that the term Privy Council was revived in Württemberg in 1816 and continued to exist as a body of that name until 1911 was a Württemberg peculiarity. However, there were also comparable bodies with different names in other countries in the 19th century, such as the Prussian State Council and the State Council in Bavaria.

== Duchy of Württemberg ==
The modern state administration of Old Württemberg went back to Christoph, Duke of Württemberg's second chancellery order of May 1553 and consisted of three council bodies at the highest level. Political matters were discussed and enacted in the Upper Council for Foreign Affairs, Internal Affairs, Police and Justice. This political council was supported by two other councils: the Rentkammer was responsible for the administration of goods and finances, and the Evangelical Church Council for the spiritual affairs of the Duchy. These three councils remained in existence as the central authorities of the Württemberg state administration until 1805.

In times when the reigning duke was a minor, a so-called privy council received supervision of the central authorities, as was the case with the death of Johann Friedrich in 1628. When his son and successor, Eberhard III, came of age in 1633, the council stayed under pressure from the estates, who were committed to both the Duke and the estates. After the turmoil of the Thirty Years' War, the Chancellery Order of 1660 stipulated that the Privy Council was only responsible to the Duke. The Privy Council consisted of the Landhofmeister (state steward), the chancellor and three other heads of the central authorities. Of these five councils, three usually came from the nobility and two from the bourgeoisie. Since then, the Oberrat (principal legal councilor), Rentkammer (treasury councilor) and Kirchenrat (church councilor) have been subordinate to the Privy Council.

With the establishment of the Kingdom of Württemberg, Frederick I dissolved these councils and replaced them with the Ministry of State, consisting of the departments of Foreign Affairs, War, the Interior, Finance, Justice, and Public Worship and Education. The heads of the departments advised the King on all important matters of state.

== Kingdom of Württemberg ==
On 8 November 1816, the Privy Council was reestablished as the Supreme State Authority reporting directly to the King. The members of the Privy Council were ex officio the heads of the six departments (ministries) as well as additional members appointed by the King (State Councilors).

The task of the Privy Council was to examine and advise on all important state affairs. The Privy Council was also the primary contact for the Württemberg State Parliament before its motions were presented to the king. The importance of the Privy Council dwindled quickly upon the establishment of the State Ministry (German: Staatsministeriums) in 1876, the Administrative Court (German: Verwaltungsgerichtshofs) in 1877 and the Competence Court (German: Kompetenzgerichtshofs) in 1879. The Privy Council in Württemberg was dissolved by law on 15 June 1911.

=== Presidents of the Privy Council ===
The Presidents of the Privy Council were:

- 1817–1821: Hans Otto von der Lühe
- 1821–1831: Christian Friedrich von Otto
- 1831–1848: Eugen von Maucler
- 1851–1867: Constantin von Neurath (Note: Constantin von Neurath was only acting only until April 24, 1855.)
- 1867–1870: Ludwig von Golther
- 1870–1870: Karl von Varnbüler
- 1870–1900: Hermann von Mittnacht
- 1900–1901: Max Schott von Schottenstein
- 1901–1906: Wilhelm August von Breitling
- 1906–1911: Karl von Weizsäcker

== See also ==
- Privy Councillor
