= August von Wächter =

Johann August von Wächter zu Lautenbach Freiherr von Wächter zu Lautenbach

Minister of Foreign Affairs of Württemberg
- In office 9 January 1871 – 27 August 1873
- Preceded by: Adolf von Taube
- Succeeded by: Hermann von Mittnacht

Württemberg Envoy in France
- In office 1850–1871
- Preceded by: Christian Wilhelm August von Fleischmann
- Succeeded by: Dissolution of legation

Personal details
- Born: Johann August Wächter; 3 April 1807 The Hague, Netherlands
- Died: 3 August 1879 (aged 72) Lautenbach, Kingdom of Württemberg
- Spouse: Josephine Lee (m. 1855; died 1879)
- Relations: Eberhard Georg Friedrich von Wächter (uncle)
- Children: 2
- Parent(s): August von Wächter; Marie Sophie Haagen

Baron Johann August von Wächter zu Lautenbach (3 April 1807 – 3 August 1879) was a Württemberg diplomat and politician.

== Early life ==
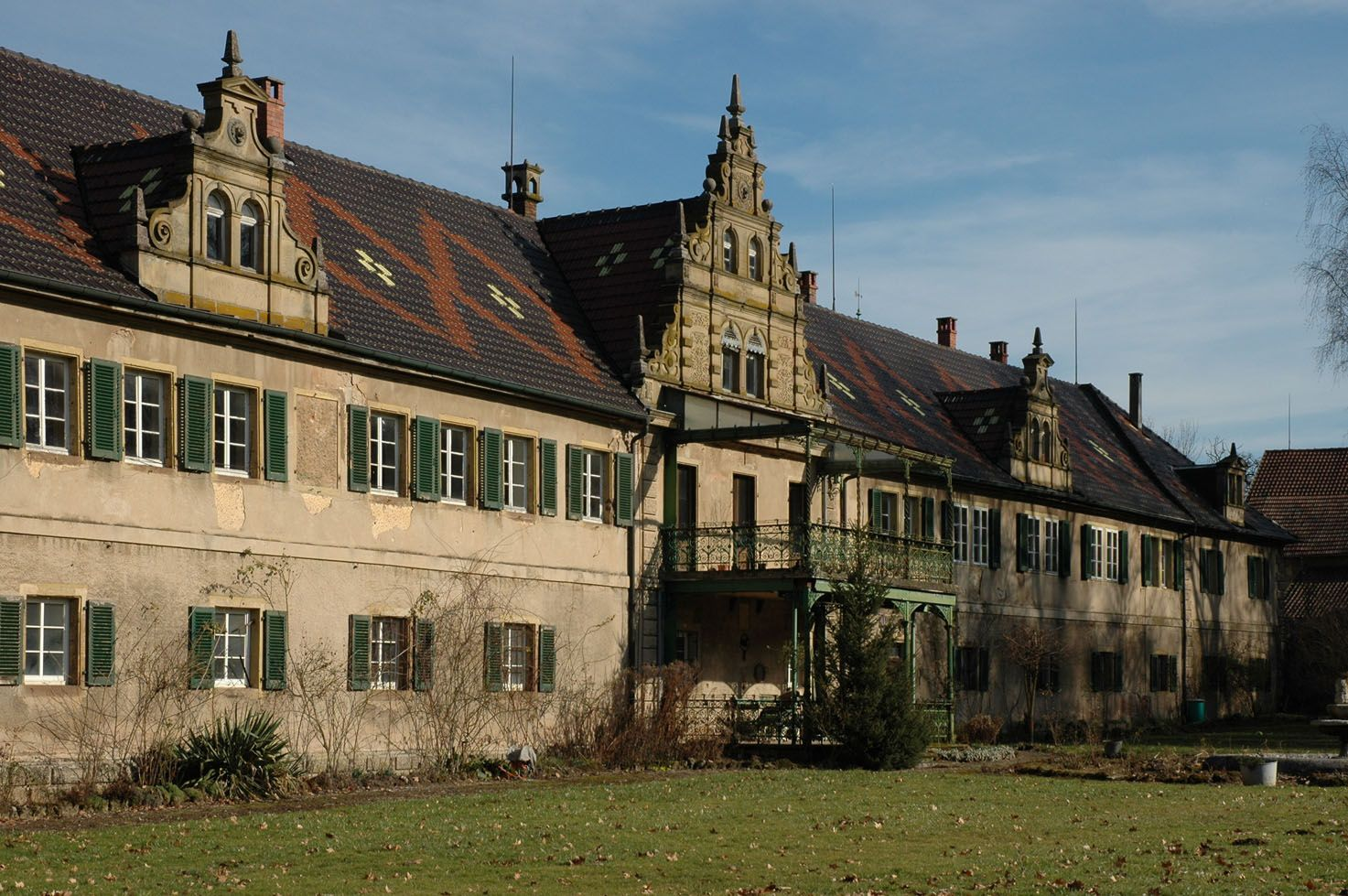
Schloss Lautenbach

Wächter was born in The Hague on 3 April 1807 into an old Württemberg family of civil servants. He was the son of diplomat Baron August Heinrich Christoph von Wächter (1776–1852) and Marie Sophie (née Haagen) (1782–1831). His father was a Württemberg Legation Councilor and since 1807 and served as chargé d'affaires of the Kingdom of Württemberg in The Hague, Brussels, and Frankfurt. He had four older siblings, including a brother, Baron Christoph Ludwig von Wächter, upon whose death in 1856, August was entailed Lord of the inherited estate in Lautenbach.

His paternal grandparents were Chief Magistrate in Balingen and privy councilor, Friedrich Christoph von Wächter and Sibylle Regine Harpprecht. His paternal uncle was painter Eberhard Georg Friedrich von Wächter. Through his grandfather's brother, Eberhard von Wächter, he was related to minister Karl Eberhard von Wächter, president of the High Court of Appeal Carl Georg von Wächter, and minister Karl von Wächter-Spittler. On 19 September 1819, his father was elevated to the Württemberg nobility by royal decree. On 1 August 1823, his father acquired the Lautenbacher estate in Oberamt Neckarsulm for 75,000 guilders. On 18 June 1825, the Wächter zu Lautenbach family was raised to the status of hereditary Barons of Württemberg.

== Career ==
Like his father, Wächter made a career in the diplomatic service of the Kingdom of Württemberg. As a royal chamberlain and privy councillor, he was on a diplomatic mission in St. Petersburg during the German revolutions of 1848–1849 at the Baden Court in Karlsruhe. From there he reported "alarming things" to Stuttgart about the course of the Revolution in Baden. In the 1850s and 1860s, Wächter was a member of the Council of State, Extraordinary Envoy and Minister Plenipotentiary of Württemberg in Paris during the reign of Napoleon III. In the autumn of 1857, he returned to Stuttgart in his capacity as Ambassador to the meeting of the two Emperors, Napoleon III and Franz Joseph I. In the run-up to the Sardinian War, Wächter had to be reminded by Foreign Minister Baron Karl Eugen von Hügel in Stuttgart to report more punctually and carefully on the policies of the French government.

=== Minister of Foreign Affairs ===
On 9 January 1871, Wächter became Foreign Minister of Württemberg, succeeding Count Adolf von Taube. As such, he was among the signatories of the Treaty of Versailles on 26 February 1871. After the unification of the Reich, the Ministry of Foreign Affairs was abolished in the Grand Duchy of Baden, however, in Württemberg, similar to its larger neighbor Bavaria, maintained its own foreign policy for reasons of prestige. Wächter wanted to retain the full scope of the tasks of the Foreign Ministry and those of the Württemberg legations and felt that he was in agreement with King Charles I on this issue, but not with the majority of the Deputies in the Second Chamber. As Foreign Minister, Wächter strengthened King Charles I in his critical attitude towards Prussia, especially since the founding of the Reich in 1871, the King felt that the government in Berlin was a constant threat to Württemberg's sovereignty. In this attitude he was strengthened by the Royal Head of Cabinet (German: Königlichen Kabinettschef) Baron von Egloffstein. On Wächter's recommendation, King Charles I stayed away from the meeting of the Three Emperors in Berlin in 1872. Because of his hesitant administration of office, Wächter came into conflict with Hermann von Mittnacht, who was pushing for the Foreign Minister to be replaced in his own favour. On 27 August 1873, Wächter resigned from his post, not least because of pressure from the Chamber of Deputies, who demanded by a vote of 62 to 11 that the State Department should be merged with another department for cost reasons. He was then succeeded by Mittnacht, who became the first Prime Minister of Württemberg in 1873.

== Personal life ==
On 19 December 1855, Wächter married American heiress Louise Josephine Lee (1833–1930) in Paris. Josephine was an older sister of the Princess of Noer (née Mary Esther Lee), the widow of Prince Frederick of Schleswig-Holstein, who later married Field Marshal Count Alfred von Waldersee, in 1874. In the year of his marriage in 1855, August von Wächter worked to have the Lautenbacher court included in the Oedheim association to obtain citizenship there. The von Wächter couple were known and valued in the Oberamt Neckarsulm and especially in Oedheim as generous patrons of numerous social institutions and foundations. Together, they were the parents of a daughter and a son:

- Wilhelmine Pauline Blanche Josephine Louise Sophie von Wächter-Lautenbach (1856–1941), who married Baron Julius Friedrich Eli von Palm of Dörzbach in 1879.
- Oleg-Ludwig David August Carl Emil von Wächter-Lautenbach (1861–1940), who was declared incompetent in 1925 and sent to a sanatorium at Weisenberg.

Wächter died on 3 August 1879 in Lautenbach. His widow was considered one of the wealthiest women in the Kingdom of Württemberg. In 1921, she inherited the entire estate of her only surviving sibling, Abby Blanche (née Lee) Murray (who had married a grandson of the a grandson of John Murray, 4th Earl of Dunmore).
