= Otto von Marchtaler =

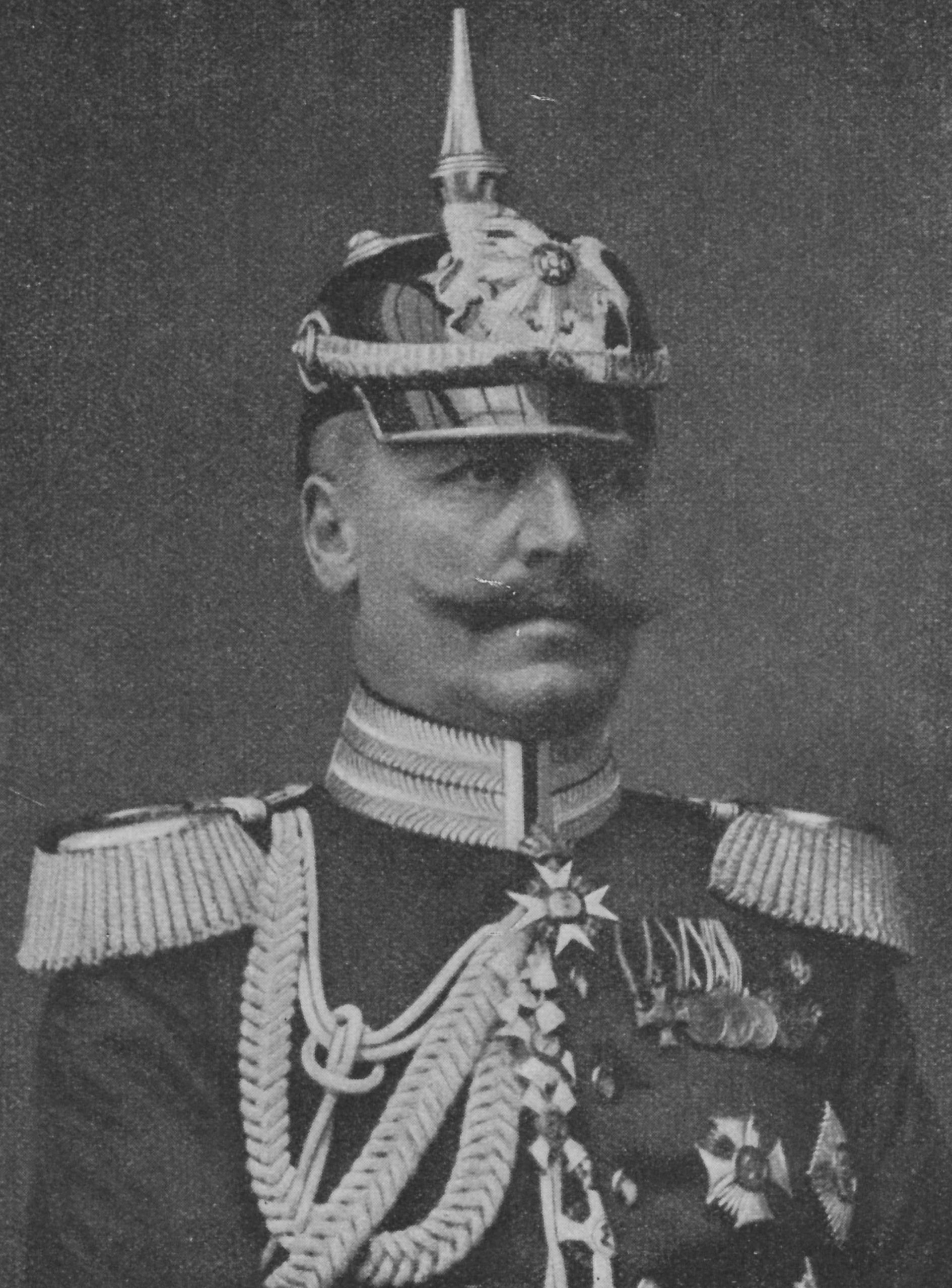

Minister of War of Württemberg
- In office 11 June 1906 – 6 November 1918
- Monarch: William II of Württemberg
- President: Wilhelm August von Breitling; Karl von Weizsäcker
- Preceded by: Albert von Schnürlen
- Succeeded by: Albert Schreiner

Personal details
- Born: Otto Erhard von Marchtaler; 6 September 1854 Wiblingen, Kingdom of Württemberg
- Died: 11 January 1920 (aged 65) Stuttgart, Württemberg, Weimar Republic

Military service
- Allegiance: Kingdom of Württemberg; North German Confederation; German Empire
- Branch/service: Royal Württemberg Army; Imperial German Army
- Years of service: 1870–1918
- Rank: Generaloberst
- Battles/wars: Franco-Prussian War; World War I
- Awards: Military Merit Order (Grand Cross); Iron Cross

Otto Erhard von Marchtaler (1854-1920) was a German general who served in the Army of Württemberg and participated in the Franco-Prussian War and World War I. He was the Minister of War of the Kingdom of Württemberg from 1906 to 1918.

== Life ==
Marchtaler was born on 9 June 1854 in Wiblingen. Marchtaler joined the Army of Württemberg as a cadet in 1869. When the Franco-Prussian War broke out, Marchtaler was assigned to the 4th Infantry Regiment. During the war, Marchtaler became a Second Lieutenant and was awarded the second class of the Iron Cross. He was promoted to Hauptmann in 1884 and became a company commander. Since 1886, Marchtaler served as an adjutant on the staff of the XIII (Royal Württemberg) Corps. In 1890 he was named Major and in 1893 was assigned to the Military Cabinet in Berlin. He was promoted to Oberst in 1897 and in the next year was assigned to the Ministry of War, since 1900 also serving as Württemberg's Military Representative.

He was promoted to Generalmajor in 1901. In 1903 he became the city commander of Stuttgart and in 1904 Marchtaler was promoted to Generalleutnant. On 11 June 1906, Marchtaler became the minister of war replacing Albert von Schnürlen. In 1908, Marchtaler was also chosen as Adjutant-General of King William II of Württemberg. In 1908 he was promoted to General der Infanterie. During World War I he continued to serve on his ministerial post, being relevant for the war economy of Württemberg. He also was named Deputy Commanding General of the XIII (Royal Württemberg) Corps. Marchtaler retired from the army on 7 November 1918 and died on 11 January 1920 in Stuttgart.

Government offices
Preceded by Albert von Schnürlen	Minister of War (Württemberg); 1906–1918	Succeeded by vacant
