= Eberhard Georg Friedrich von Wächter =

German painter

Eberhard von Wächter
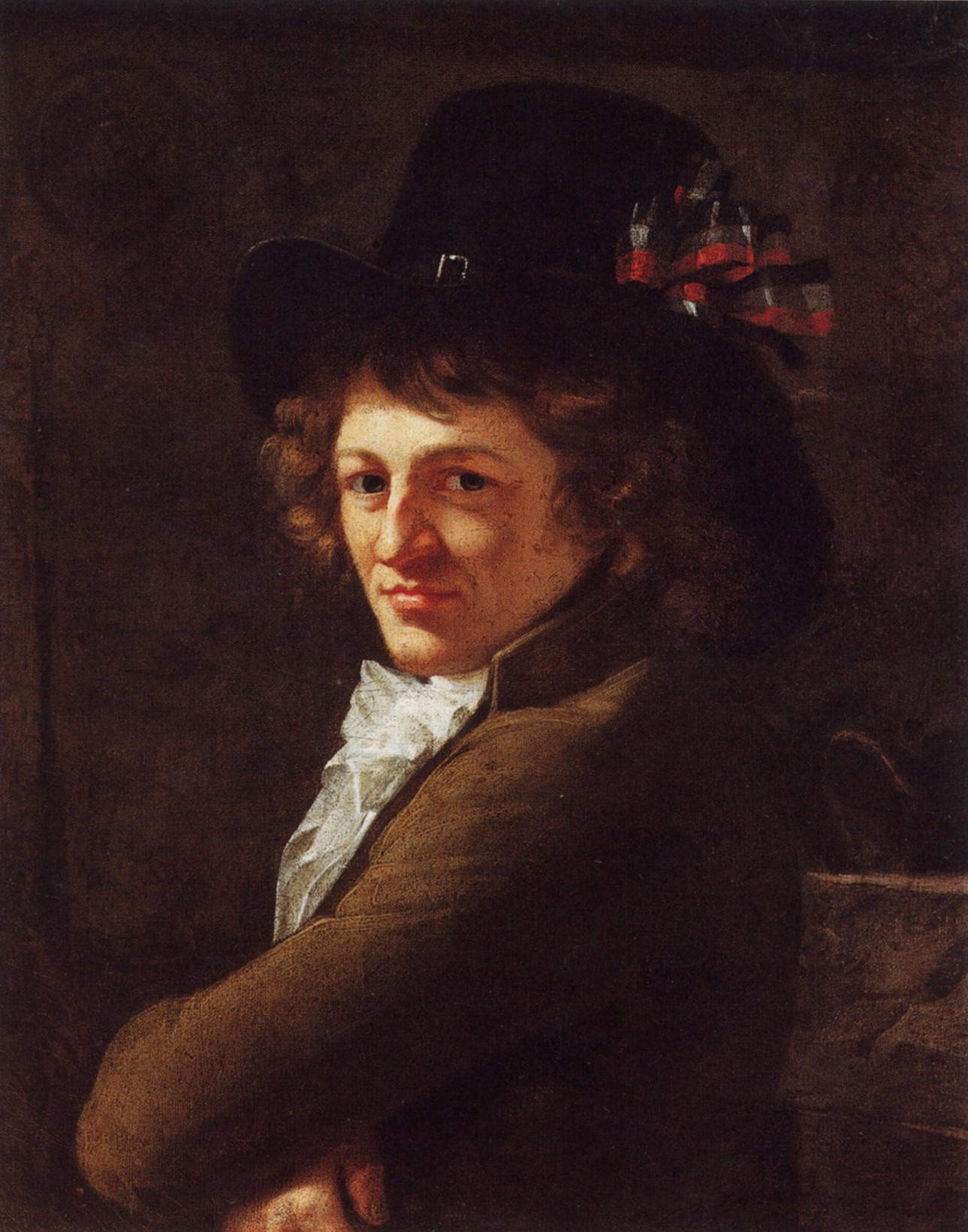
- Portrait of Wächter by Ludovike Simanowiz, 1791
- Born: Eberhard Georg Friedrich Wächter; 28 February 1762; Balingen, Duchy of Württemberg
- Died: 14 August 1852 (aged 90); Stuttgart, Kingdom of Württemberg
- Awards: Order of the Crown

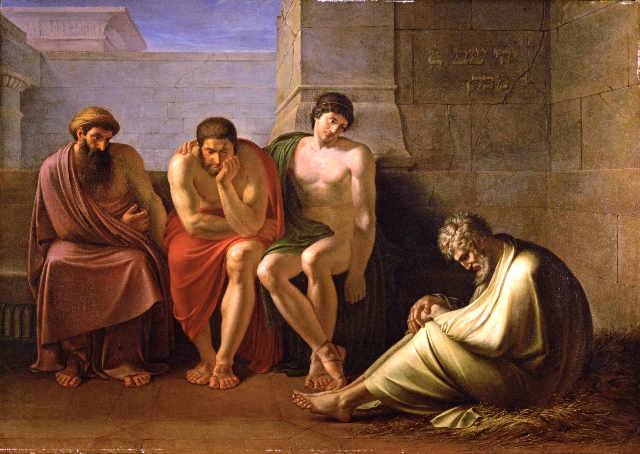
Job visited by his friends

Eberhard Georg Friedrich von Wächter (28 February 1762 – 14 August 1852) was a German painter. Wächter died in Stuttgart.

== Early life ==
Wächter was born on 28 February 1762 in Balingen in the Duchy of Württemberg. From an old Württemberg family of civil servants, he was the second son of Chief Magistrate in Balingen and privy councilor, Friedrich Christoph von Wächter (1733–1807) and Sibylle Regine Harpprecht (1737–1793). Among his siblings were diplomat Baron August Heinrich Christoph von Wächter, a Württemberg Legation Councilor who served as chargé d'affaires of Württemberg in The Hague, Brussels, and Frankfurt, and was the father of Baron August von Wächter, who served as Minister of Foreign Affairs of Württemberg. Through his uncle, Eberhard von Wächter, he was related to minister Karl Eberhard von Wächter, president of the High Court of Appeal Carl Georg von Wächter, and minister Karl von Wächter-Spittler.

== Career ==
He studied painting at Paris under Jean-Baptiste Regnault, Jacques-Louis David, and Antoine-Jean, Baron Gros, and later went to Rome, where he improved his French classical style of painting by the study of Italian art. He appreciated Carsten's freer style with its sterling merit, and adopted the ideas of the Romantic school. While at Rome he became a Catholic.

He gained great influence over his contemporaries by his fine perception of the depths of feeling that could be evoked from the subjects he used. To this period of his best work belong a "Child Jesus on the Lamb", "Belisarius at the Porta Pinciana at Rome", and "Job and His Friends". In 1798 the French drove him from Rome, and he went to Vienna, as he found no place in his native town of Stuttgart, on account of his conversion. At Vienna he illustrated books and made drawings, many of which were etched or engraved by Rahl and Leybold. While there he also painted a "Mater dolorosa", a "Caritas", and "Criton visiting Socrates in Prison".

Wachter was a founder of the Brotherhood of St. Luke, a society of those painters who soon after established at Rome a more natural and thoughtful school of painting, known as the Nazarenes. Wachter finally went to Stuttgart, where he painted "Cimon in Prison", "Ulysses and the Sirens", the "Boat of Life", "Andromache standing at the Urn with Hector's Ashes", the "Greek Muse mourning over the Ruins of Athens", a "Virgin with St. John Sorrowing at the Grave of Christ", etc. He excelled in treating lyrical and elegiac subjects.

== Honours ==
1831 Eberhard von Wachter was awarded as Knight of the Order of the Crown (Württemberg), which was associated with the personal title of nobility. The city of Stuttgart named 1873 Wächterstraße and 1902 the guards squadron after him.
