= Max Schott von Schottenstein =

Max Schott von Schottenstein Freiherr Schott von Schottenstein
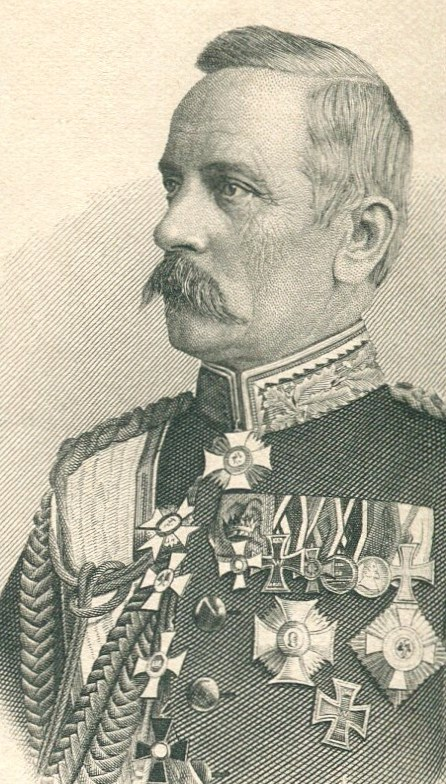

Prime Minister of Württemberg
- In office 10 November 1900 – 15 April 1901
- Monarch: William II
- Preceded by: Hermann von Mittnacht
- Succeeded by: Wilhelm August von Breitling

Minister of War of Württemberg
- In office 10 May 1892 – 15 April 1901
- Preceded by: Gustav von Steinheil
- Succeeded by: Albert von Schurlen

Personal details
- Born: Maximilian Schott von Schottenstein; 22 November 1836 Ulm, Kingdom of Württemberg
- Died: 10 August 1917 (aged 80) Schloss Schottenstein, Itzgrund, Franconia
- Spouse: Baroness Ottilie von Ochs (m. 1868; died 1913)
- Children: 6
- Parent(s): Karl Schott von Schottenstein; Luise Jakobine Friederike von Vischer

Maximilian Schott von Schottenstein (22 November 1836 – 10 August 1917) was a Württemberg infantry General, as well as Minister of War from 1892 to 1901 and Prime Minister from 1900 to 1901.

== Early life ==
Schottenstein was born on 22 November 1836 in Ulm into an old Franconian noble family. He was the son of the Württemberg politician Karl Schott von Schottenstein (1792–1882) and Luise Jakobine Friederike (née von Vischer) (1803–1849), widow of Grundherr zu Altenthann and Weiherhaus. From his father's first marriage to Baroness Adelheid Brand von Lindau (who died in 1830), he was a younger half-brother of Karl Albrecht Dietrich Robert Schott von Schottenstein, Eduard Schott von Schottenstein, Adelheid Schott von Schottenstein, Friedrich Ludwig Schott von Schottenstein.

His paternal grandparents were Oberjägermeister Johann Sigmund Schott von Schottenstein and Baroness Albertine Wilhelmine Karoline von Hessberg (German: Heßberg).

After attending high school in Ulm, he attended the Evangelical Seminary in Maulbronn from 1851 to 1855. From 1855 to 1858, he attended Kriegsschule in Ludwigsburg and on 20 September 1858, he became a lieutenant in the 5th Infantry Regiment of the Württemberg Army.

== Career ==
In 1861 he joined the Pioneer Corps, was promoted to captain in 1866 and was transferred to the War Ministry in 1867 as a consultant. During the Franco-Prussian War, he was on the staff of the Württemberg Field Division and took part in the battles of Wörth, Sedan and Villiers and the Siege of Paris. In 1872, he became Company Commander of "Queen Olga" Grenadier Regiment (1st Württemberg) No. 119, promoted to major in 1873 and, in 1876, Battalion Commander in 122nd Fusilier Regiment. He was made lieutenant colonel in 1879, and served as Commander of the "Queen Olga" Grenadier Regiment from 1883 to 1888. In 1884, he was promoted to Colonel and, in 1888, to major general and Commander of the 51st Infantry Brigade. In 1890, he became Commander of the 30th Division in Strasbourg and was promoted to lieutenant general.

=== Political career ===
From 10 May 1892 to 15 April 1901 he was Minister of War of Württemberg. During his tenure, among other things, he established the military training area in Münsingen. On 18 April 1896, Schott von Schottenstein was promoted to General of the Infantry by King William II. After Hermann von Mittnacht's resignation as head of government, Schott von Schottenstein became Prime Minister of Württemberg, in addition to his work as Minister of War, serving from 10 November 1900 to 15 April 1901. During this time he was also President of the Privy Council. Only a few months in office as Prime Minister, Schott von Schottenstein had to resign from his ministerial posts because he had compromised himself as a witness in a pandering trial. (Note: In March 1901, "a woman was arrested in Stuttgart at whose fashionable residence, it was alleged, scandalous orgies had occurred. Baron Schott von Schottenstein was accused of being one of the principal participants in the orgies, and was called upon to testify at the preliminary hearing of the charges against the woman. Shortly after the King of Württemberg gave him leave of absence, and there was a report that he had committed suicide. From the outset his dismissal or his resignation was expected as the inevitable outcome of the scandal.")

=== Later life ===
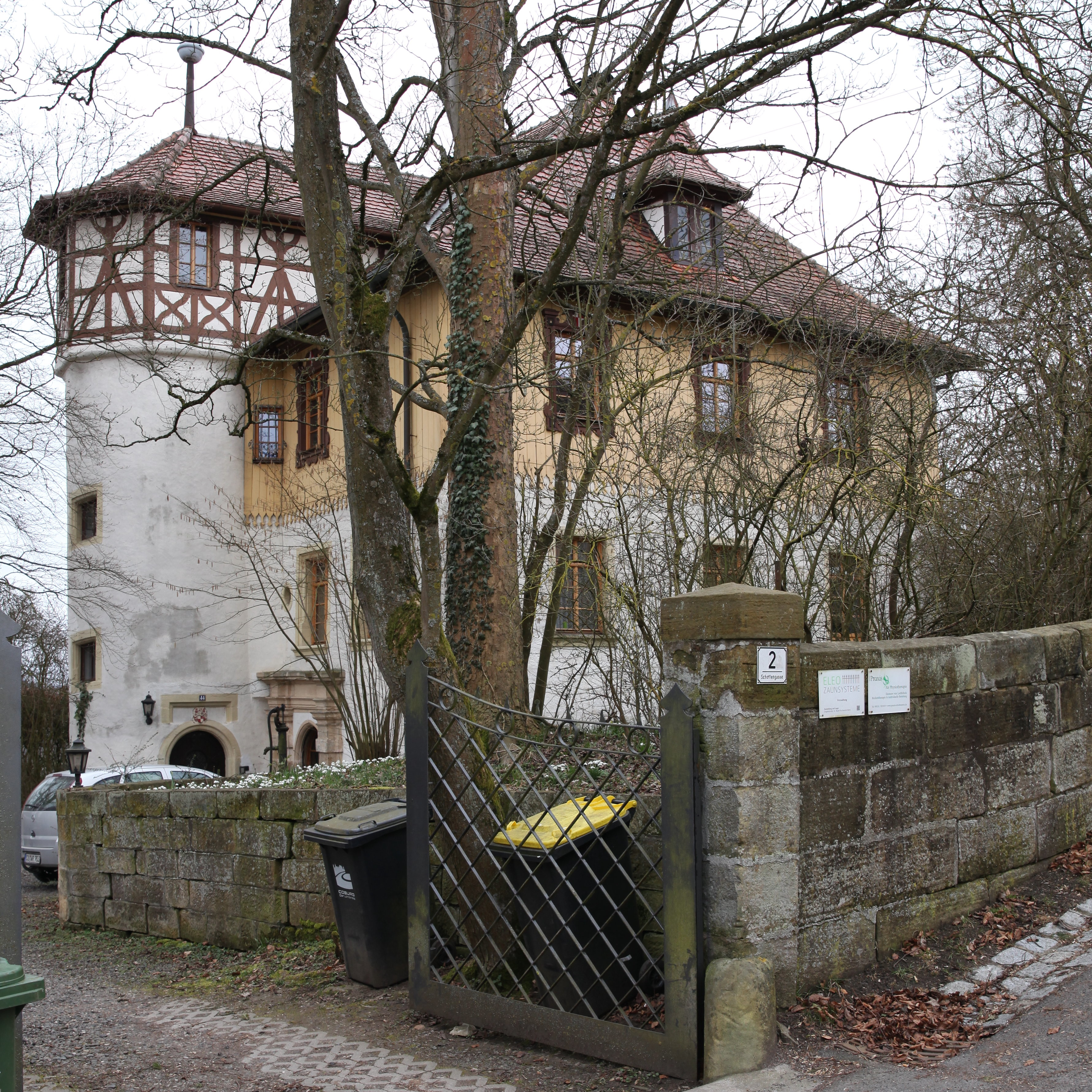
Schloss Schottenstein

After his resignation, he retired to Schloss Schottenstein, his ancestors' castle in Itzgrund near Coburg in Franconia that he bought and restored in 1888.

== Personal life ==
On 19 July 1868, he married Baroness Ottilie von Ochs (1845–1913), a daughter of Baroness Therese Grote General Carl von Ochs, in Kassel. Together, they were the parents of six daughters:

- Klara Gabriele Therese Wilhelmine Marie Schott von Schottenstein (b. 1869)
- Sophie Mathilde Adelheid Siegriede Schott von Schottenstein (b. 1871)
- Emma Charlotte Albertine Adolfine Schott von Schottenstein (1872–1946), who married Reichswehr Maj.-Gen. Georg Loeffelholz von Colberg (1869–1938).
- Olga Marianne Charlotte Friederike Therese Schott von Schottenstein (b. 1876), who married Karl Grundherr zu Altenthann and Weiherhaus, in 1897.
- Amelie Johanna Emma Auguste Schott von Schottenstein (b. 1880), who married Baron Friedrich Löffelholz von Colberg (1870–1948), in 1905.
- Ida Marie Emma Karoline Elisabeth Schott von Schottenstein (1881–1963), who married Baron Gustav von Lindenfels (1873–1950), in 1912.

Schottenstein died on 10 August 1917 at Schloss Schottenstein.
