= Eugen von Maucler =

German politician

Eugen von Maucler Reichsfreiherr von Maucler
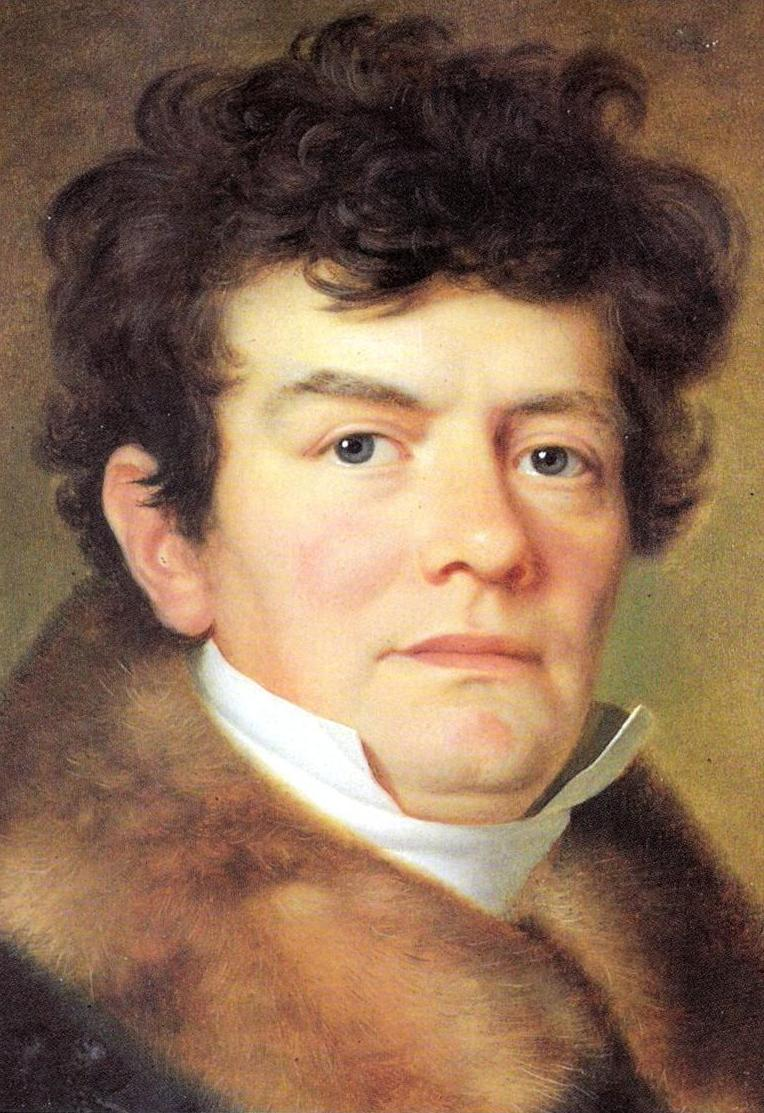
- Portrait of Maucler, by Franz Seraph Stirnbrand, 1832

President of the Privy Council of Württemberg
- In office 1831–1848
- Preceded by: Christian Friedrich von Otto
- Succeeded by: Friedrich von Römer

Minister of Justice of Württemberg
- In office 1818–1831
- Preceded by: Constantin Franz Fürchtegott von Neurath
- Succeeded by: Karl Heinrich von Schwab

Personal details
- Born: Paul Friedrich Theodor Eugen von Maucler; 30 May 1783; Étupes
- Died: 28 January 1859 (aged 75); Ludwigsburg
- Spouse: Sofie von Beroldingen (after 1808)

Paul Friedrich Theodor Eugen, Reichsfreiherr von Maucler (30 May 1783 – 28 January 1859) was a Württemberg politician and bibliophile.

== Early life ==
Maucler was born on 30 May 1783 in Étupes, in the county of Mömpelgard (today the Doubs department of France), which was then a feudal county of the Holy Roman Empire. He was the son of Louise Sophia Eleonore Edle von le Fort (1758–1801), a daughter of Edler von le Fort, and Reichsfreiherr Friedrich von Maucler (1735–1796), who was Oberhofmeister to Frederick II Eugene, Duke of Württemberg, Governor of the Princely County of Montbéliard. Among his siblings was sister Baroness Friederike Auguste Pauline von Maucler, who married Count Ferdinand Ludwig von Zeppelin.

== Career ==
After studying law in Tübingen, Giessen and Wetzlar in 1799, he entered the Württemberg Civil Service in 1803. He held a number of high-ranking offices in the state administration. He first began as an Assessor with the higher State Government in Ellwangen and was appointed to the government council in 1804. In 1806, he entered the Higher Judicial College. In 1808, he was appointed district captain in Ludwigsburg. In 1809, as General State Commissioner for the Kingdom of Württemberg, he took over the territory around Mergentheim, which had previously belonged to the Teutonic Order. While carrying out this mission, he fell into the hands of rebellious peasants, but was eventually released from captivity unharmed. In 1810, Maucler became Councilor of the Supreme Court in Tübingen and, in 1811, bailiff in Calw. In 1812, he moved to Esslingen as Chief Director of the Criminal Tribunal.

In 1815, Maucler was a member of the Estates meetings convened by King Frederick I, where he acted in 1817 as a representative of those entitled to vote. From March to June 1817, Maucler represented the Counts of Görlitz and, from May 1817, the Counts of Neipperg and the Barons of Welden. Maucler made sure that the New Württemberg deputies had the same rights as the Old Württemberg deputies were granted. On 2 June 1817, he voted to adopt the draft Royal Constitution, but found himself in the minority. In 1816 he was appointed Court Chamber President and Chief Court Manager.

=== Ministerial career ===
In 1817, he was appointed to the Privy Council by King William I, and from 1818 to 1831, he served as Minister of Justice. From 1831 to 1848, he served as President of the Privy Council which was akin to Prime Minister of Württemberg. In 1848, the conservative politician, who was particularly concerned with the organization of the national territory, which had grown considerably after secularisation, retired. From 1819 until his death in 1859, Maucler was a member of the Chamber of Lords of the Württemberg Diet.

== Personal life ==
On 28 April 1808, Maucler married Countess Sofie von Beroldingen (1787–1852). The marriage produced five children, including:

- Baron Friedrich Wilhelm Paul Emile von Maucler (1809–1870), the Chief of Staff and Chamberlain to the King of Württemberg; he married Françoise Joséphine Anna Jamin de Bermuy, a daughter of General Jamin, Marquis de Bermuy, in 1838.
- Baron Friedrich Wilhelm Max Jules von Maucler (1811–1850), secretary of the Württemberg legation in Paris.
- Baroness Marie von Maucler (1818–1843)
- Baron Guillaume von Maucler (1819–1846)
- Baron Wilhelm Paul Heinrich Emil von Maucler (1829–1856), a Cavalry Major in the Württemberg Army who married Mary Guise Spencer in 1834.

Maucler died on 28 January 1859 in Ludwigsburg.
