= Wilhelm August von Breitling =

German lawyer

Minister-President of the Kingdom of Württemberg
- In office 1901–1906
- Monarch: William II
- Preceded by: Max Schott von Schottenstein
- Succeeded by: Karl von Weizsäcker

Minister of Justice of Württemberg
- In office 1896–1906
- Preceded by: Eduard von Faber
- Succeeded by: Friedrich von Schmidlin

Personal details
- Born: Wilhelm August Breitling; 4 January 1835 Gaildorf, Schwäbisch Hall
- Died: 20 April 1914 (aged 79) Stuttgart
- Spouse: Lina Koch (after 1866)
- Children: 3
- Parent(s): Paul Breitling; Karoline Wucherer

Wilhelm August Breitling (from 1885 von Breitling; 4 January 1835 – 20 April 1914) was a German lawyer who served as Prime Minister of Württemberg from 1901 to 1906.

== Early life ==
Breitling was born in Gaildorf in Schwäbisch Hall on 4 January 1835. He was the eldest of five sons of Paul Breitling (1798–1867) and Karoline (née Wucherer) Breitling, a daughter of clerk Friedrich Wilhelm Wucherer in Langenburg.

By 1835, his father became chief magistrate in Göppingen and the family lived in a service apartment in Schloss Göppingen. In Esslingen, where his father was later appointed Senior Judge at the District Court, Wilhelm attended Esslinger Gymnasium (known today as the Georgii-Gymnasium) until he was 14 and successfully completed his state exams (which were a prerequisite for entry into Blaubeuren Abbey). After passing the exam, Breitling was admitted to Blaubeuren in October 1849. As he intended to study law, and not theology, he did not enter as a seminarian but as a guest.

After passing the matura examination (Abitur), he began studying law in Tübingen in the winter semester of 1853 and joined the venerable Germania Tübingen (student fraternity) the same year.

== Career ==
After completing his law studies in Tübingen and Heidelberg, Breitling entered the Württemberg civil service and worked at various court locations beginning in 1860. In 1883, Breitling became a consulting counselor in the Ministry of Justice, in 1887 he was promoted to Director there. In 1889, he became Real Councilor of State, as well as a member of the Privy Council and the Administrative Court. On 16 September 1896 he was appointed head of the Department of Justice, heading the Ministry of Justice until 4 December 1906.

=== Minister-President of Württemberg ===
On 15 April 1901, Breitling also took over the leadership of the overall government of the Kingdom of Württemberg after his predecessor, Max Schott von Schottenstein, had to resign due to a scandal. Breitling's appointment as President of the State Ministry was generally regarded as an interim solution, since he was already 66 years old at the time, and the other candidate, Karl von Weizsäcker, was considered too inexperienced at the time. As Minister of Justice, Breitling kept the Civil Code in Württemberg, whereby some legal peculiarities of the state were preserved. Breitling had previously taken part in drafting the German Civil Code. In September 1901, Breitling took part in memorial services in Stuttgart for the American President, William McKinley, who had been assassinated.

In addition to tax and administrative reform, Breitling's government was characterized by a revision of the Württemberg constitution which converted the Second Chamber (German: Abgeordnetenhaus) of the Diet into a purely people's chamber with 92 elected representatives, before any other German state. The previously privileged members of the Second Chamber moved to the First Chamber (German: Standesherren), which ceased to be purely an organ of the nobility. The Breitling government remained a purely civil servant government, despite the beginnings of a parliamentary monarchy under the long-standing Mittnacht government. According to the Württemberg constitution of 1819, the King alone had the right to appoint and dismiss Ministers. This principle of a monarchical authoritarian state did not change in liberal Württemberg until the Liesching government two days before the German Revolution.

Following a stroke, Breitling retired in December 1906 and was succeeded by Weizsäcker as Minister-President, who praised Breitling as an excellent civil servant, and by Friedrich von Schmidlin, as Minister of Justice.

== Personal life ==
In 1866 he married Lina Koch (1846–1937), the daughter of the magistrate Friedrich Koch. Together, they were the parents of three daughters.

Breitling died in Stuttgart on 20 April 1914.

== Honors and awards ==
- 1885: Knight's Cross 1st Class of the Order of the Württemberg Crown (which was associated with the personal title of nobility)
- 1890: Commander's Cross, second class, of the Friedrich Order
- 1894: Commendation Cross of the Order of the Crown
- 1900: Grand Cross with Crown of the Friedrich Order
- 1902: Grand Cross of the Order Order of the Crown
- 1906: Award of the Diamonds to the Grand Cross of the Württemberg Crown
