= Karl von Varnbüler und zu Hemmingen =

German politician (1809–1889)

Baron Karl Varnbüler von und zu Hemmingen
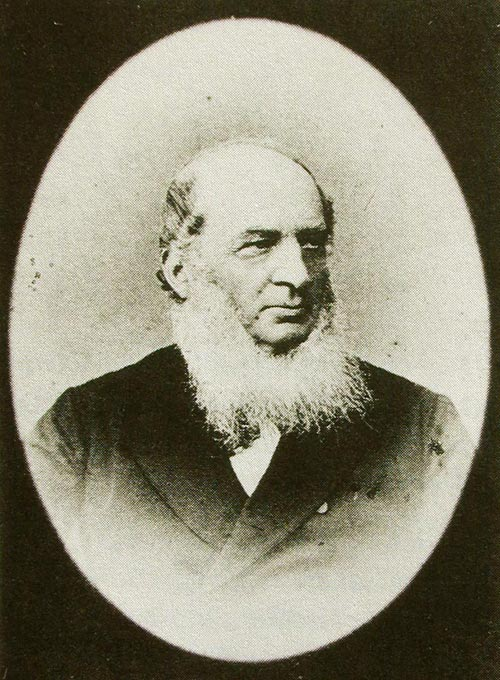

Minister-President of Württemberg
- In office 1864–1870
- Monarch: Charles I
- Preceded by: Joseph von Linden
- Succeeded by: Hermann von Mittnacht

Minister of Foreign Affairs of Württemberg
- In office 1864–1870
- Preceded by: Joseph von Linden
- Succeeded by: Adolf von Taube

Personal details
- Born: 13 May 1809 Hemmingen, Kingdom of Württemberg
- Died: 26 March 1889 (aged 79) Berlin, German Empire
- Spouse: Baroness Henriette von Süsskind (m. 1835; died 1889)
- Children: 7 legimitate Gustav Meyrink (illegitimate)
- Education: Eberhard Karls University

Friedrich Karl Gottlob Freiherr Varnbüler von und zu Hemmingen (13 May 1809 – 26 March 1889) was a German politician who served as minister-president and foreign minister of the Kingdom of Württemberg, and later as member of the Reichstag after the unification of Germany.

== Early life ==
Varnbüler was born at his father's estate in Hemmingen on 13 May 1809. He was the son of Baroness Friederika von Woellwarth-Polsingen (1776–1818), a lady-in-waiting to Duchess Sophie Albertine of Württemberg (wife of Frederick Augustus, Duke of Württemberg-Neuenstadt), and Baron Karl von Varnbüler von und zu Hemmingen (1776–1832), a Royal Württemberg Privy Councilor who served as Minister of Finance from 1827 to 1832.

He was a descendant of the Württemberg politician and diplomat Johann Konrad Varnbüler (1595–1657). His younger sister Ernestine married Count Götz Christoph von Degenfeld-Schonburg, a Württemberg officer and the king's aide-de-camp, in 1831.

After attending high school in Stuttgart, Varnbüler studied law and political science at the Eberhard Karls University in Tübingen and at the Humboldt University of Berlin.

== Career ==
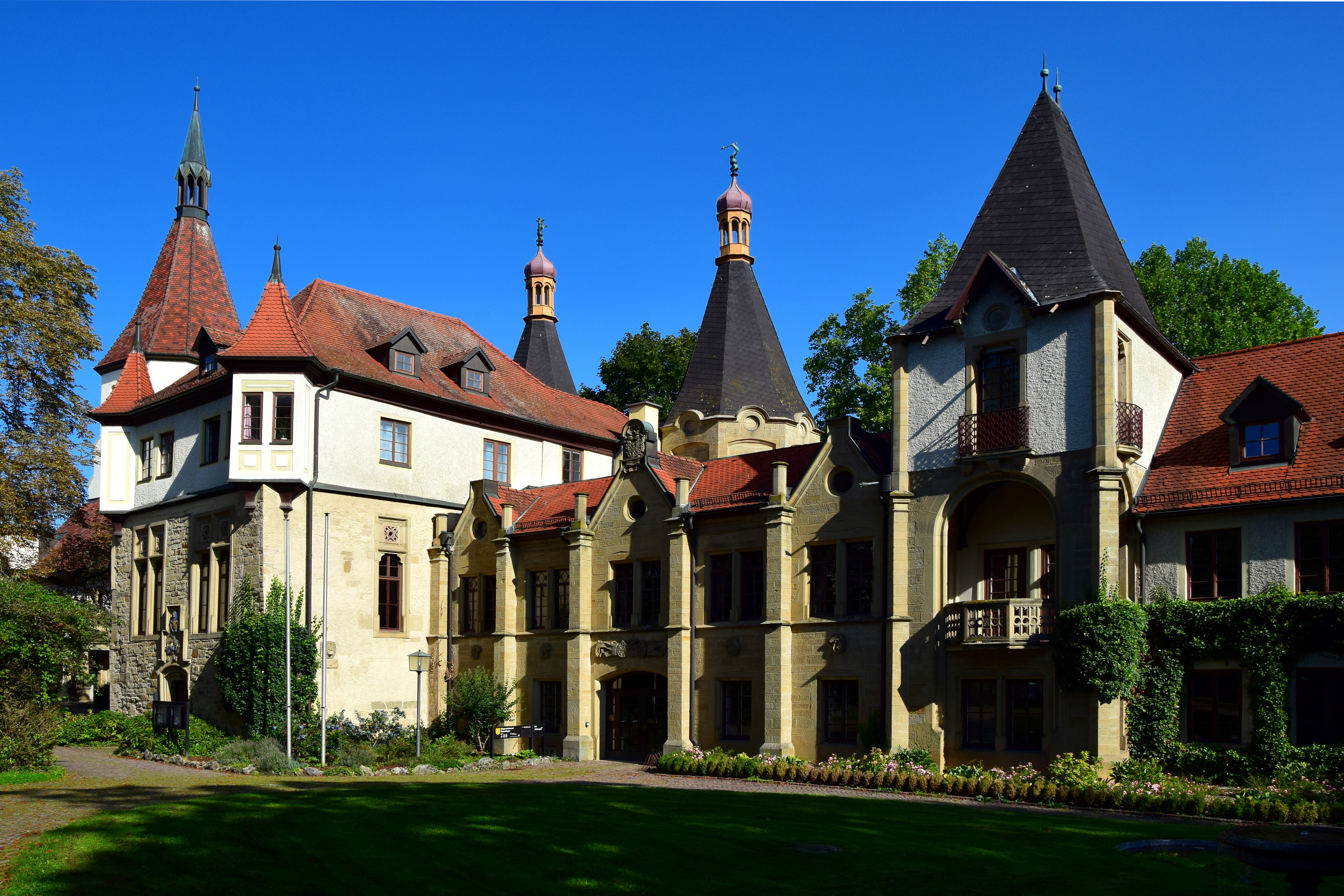
Schloss Hemmingen

From 1838 to 1839, he was an Assessor at the Württemberg district government in Ludwigsburg before dedicating himself to the management of his estates, becoming regarded as one of the best farmers in the Kingdom of Württemberg. Varnbüler served as was chairman of the Agricultural Association in the Oberamt Leonberg. In 1849, he inherited a machine factory in Vienna from his father-in-law, Baron von Süsskind.

=== Political career ===
As a representative of the knighthood of the Neckarkreis, Varnbüler held a seat in the lower house (German: Abgeordnetenhaus) of the Württemberg State Parliament from 1845 to 1849 and, again, from 1851 until his death in 1889. In 1848, he was a member of the Frankfurt Parliament. A noted speaker, Varnbüler soon became a member of the most important commissions, which often appointed him Speaker, particularly on Economic issues. On 21 September 1864, King Charles I, who had just come into power, appointed Varnbüler Minister of Foreign Affairs. Between 1864 and 1870 he was de facto senior minister and as such succeeded Joseph von Linden as effective Prime Minister. By 1864, Varnbüler had united the management of the railways with the Ministry of Foreign Affairs and took care of the further expansion of the railway network. Upon the break out of the Austro-Prussian War in 1866, Varnbüler opted for an alliance between Württemberg and Austria. After Prussia's victory, King Charles dispatched Prince Frederick and Varnbüler to the Prussian headquarters in Mikulov in June 1866. Varnbüler went from Nikolsburg to Würzburg to take part in the conclusion of the armistice to be agreed with General von Manteuffel. On 5 August, Otto von Bismarck demanded the southern German States send appropriately authorized envoys to Berlin for peace negotiations. Varnbüler immediately set out on the journey. After just one week, on 13 August, the Württemberg peace treaty with Prussia was complete.

Varnbüler opposed efforts to expand the competence of the Customs Parliament and to turn the "Customs Parliament" into a "full Parliament". In the customs parliamentary elections, the German party lost in all 17 Württemberg constituencies. Varnbüler himself was elected in the four Württemberg constituencies. The union of the southern German states demanded by the Democratic Party to form the so-called Southern Confederation. At the same time he emphasized the firm intention of the Württemberg government to faithfully observe the treaties with Prussia. On 23 March 1870, the King appointed the Foreign Minister as President of the Privy Council, succeeding Ludwig von Golther. A few weeks after the outbreak of the Franco-Prussian War, he retired on 31 August 1870 and was succeeded by Hermann von Mittnacht as senior minister. In 1872 he was elected to the Reichstag in the Second Württemberg constituency, holding office until 1881.

In the Reichstag he was a member of the Free Conservative Party. In the middle of 1878, Bismarck received from him a fully worked out plan for the customs and tax reform in the form of a memorandum. Even after losing his seat in the Reichstag in 1881, Varnbüler followed Reich politics with great interest and repeatedly commented on political issues of the day in articles in the free-conservative journal Die Post. Otherwise, he took an active part in the negotiations in the Württemberg state parliament until a few months before his death and devoted himself to the management of his estates with old zeal. He had the Schloss Hemmingen rebuilt in a neo-Gothic style and laid out an English gardens.

== Personal life ==
On 15 October 1835, Varnbüler married Baroness Henriette von Süsskind (1815–1902) in Augsburg. Together, they were the parents of seven children:

- Anna von Varnbüler und zu Hemmingen (1836–1925), who married Friedrich Schott von Schottenstein (grandparents of Friedrich von Prittwitz und Gaffron). She later married Caesar von Hofacker (grandparents of Caesar von Hofacker Jr.)
- Konrad von Varnbüler und zu Hemmingen (1837–1881), Royal Württemberg Legation Counselor who married Baroness Bertha von Gemmingen-Hornberg.
- Eberhard von Varnbüler und zu Hemmingen (1838–1841), who died young.
- Hildegard von Varnbüler und zu Hemmingen (1843–1914), who married Baron Karl Hugo von Spitzemberg (brother of Wilhelm von Spitzemberg), Württemberg Ambassador in St. Petersburg; she became known as a friend of Otto von Bismarck and was the author of a famous diary on Imperial society.
- Sophie von Varnbüler und zu Hemmingen (1844–1876), who married Nikolaus von Below, a German politician in the Prussian House of Lords.
- Elisabeth von Varnbüler und zu Hemmingen (1846–1910), who married Baron Hermann von Erffa, a Thuringian landowner and politician.
- Axel von Varnbüler und zu Hemmingen (1851–1937), the Württemberg Ambassador to the Russian Empire and to Prussia; he married Natalie Gavriliuk in 1894.

Varnbüler died of pneumonia in Berlin on 26 March 1889.

=== Relationship with Marie Meyer ===
From a liaison with the actress Maria Wilhelmina Adelheyd Meier, he was the father of writer Gustav Meyrink (1868–1932), who grew up with his mother and has been described as the "most respected German language writer in the field of supernatural fiction".
