= Treaty of Versailles (1871) =

Preliminary treaty to end the Franco-Prussian war

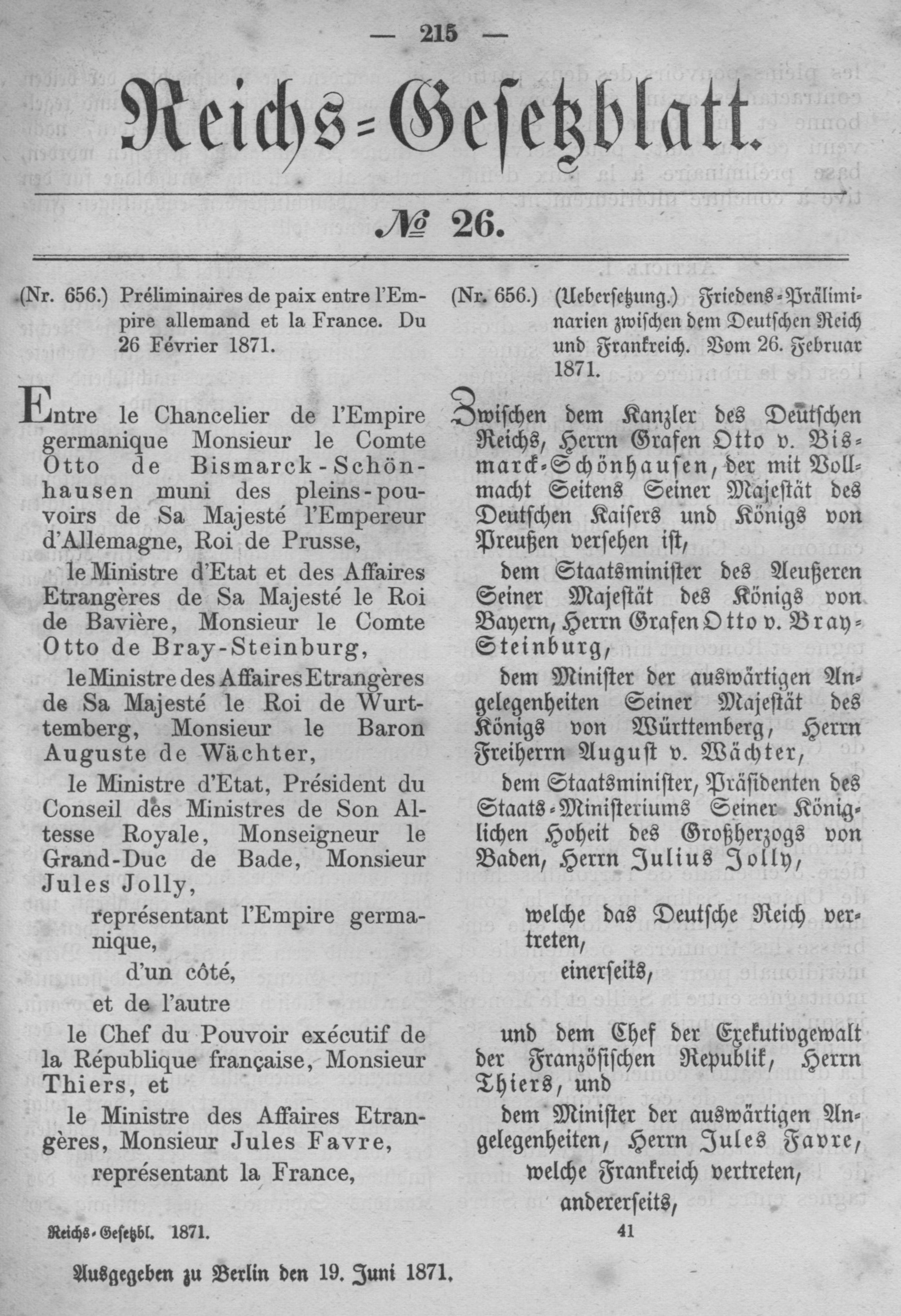
- 1871 Imperial Law Gazette of Germany
- Type: Bilateral treaty
- Signed: 26 February 1871
- Location: Paris, France
- Original signatories: Germany; France
- Ratifiers: Germany; France
- Language: French

The Treaty of Versailles of 1871 ended the Franco-Prussian War and was signed by Adolphe Thiers of the Third French Republic and Otto von Bismarck of the newly formed German Empire on 26 February 1871. A preliminary treaty, it was used to solidify the initial armistice of 28 January between the powers. It was ratified by the Treaty of Frankfurt on 10 May of the same year which confirmed the supremacy of the German Empire, replacing France as the dominant military power on the European continent.

Paris's governing body, the Government of National Defense had made an armistice, effective from 28 January, by surrendering to the Germans to end the siege of Paris; Jules Favre, a prominent French politician, did so, meeting with Bismarck in Versailles to sign the armistice. Adolphe Thiers emerged by the time of a formal treaty as the new French leader as the country began reconstructing its government.

== History ==
=== Disruption of the French government ===
In the first seven weeks of the Franco-Prussian War, Prussian and other German forces experienced several great military successes against the struggling French government, including the capture of the French emperor, Napoleon III at the Battle of Sedan on 2 September 1870. This caused the collapse of Second French Empire, to be replaced by a Government of National Defense on 4 September. The Government of National Defense served as an interim governing body before a new French Republic could hold elections, and received unfavorable responses from Parisians as it was unable to break the siege. Statesmen evacuated to establish offices in Bordeaux and Tours, which left French government officials unable to communicate, further upsetting the structure of the state and weakening the government.

=== German unification ===
While the French government deteriorated, Bismarck succeeded in achieving the unification of most of Germany on 18 January 1871, creating the German Empire. King Wilhelm I of Prussia was declared emperor of the newly created empire in the Hall of Mirrors in the Versailles Palace. The new German command structure wanted to sign a peace treaty to gain France's colonial possessions; however, Bismarck opted for an immediate truce as his primary reason for war, German unification, had already been accomplished. He was concerned that further violence would render more German casualties and draw French resentment. He was also wary of drawing attention from other European nations, fearing that they might be moved to intervene if the new German state appeared power-hungry. Both sides were eager to sign a treaty by the beginning of February 1871.

=== Provisions of the treaty ===
The terms of the treaty included a war indemnity of five billion francs to be paid by France to Germany. The Imperial German Army would continue to occupy parts of France until the payment was complete. The treaty also recognized Wilhelm I as the emperor of the newly united German Empire. Preliminary discussion began on the cession of Alsace and the Moselle region of Lorraine to Germany. Despite Bismarck's objections, Helmuth von Moltke the Elder and the German General Staff insisted that the territory was necessary as a defensive barrier. Bismarck opposed the annexation because he did not wish to make Germany a permanent enemy of France. The portion of Alsace-Lorraine annexed was later slightly reduced at the Treaty of Frankfurt, allowing France to retain the Territory of Belfort.

=== Signatories ===
The signatories were:

- Count Otto von Bismarck, Chancellor of the German Empire
- Count Otto von Bray-Steinburg, Minister of Foreign Affairs of Bavaria
- Baron August von Wächter, Minister of Foreign Affairs of Württemberg
- Julius Jolly, President of the Council of Baden
- Adolphe Thiers, President of the French Republic
- Jules Favre, Minister for Foreign Affairs of France
