= Eberhard Wächter =

Eberhard Wächter may refer to:

- Eberhard Georg Friedrich von Wächter (1762–1852), German painter
- Eberhard Wächter (baritone), sometimes spelled Waechter, (1929–1992), Austrian opera singer
