= Ministry of Justice of Württemberg =

Ministry of the Kingdom of Württemberg

The Ministry of Justice of Württemberg (German: Württembergischer Außenminister) was a ministry of the Kingdom of Württemberg, that existed from 1806 to 1919.

== History ==
The position was also called the "Chief of the Department of Justice."

=== Kingdom of Württemberg ===
Upon the establishment of the Kingdom of Württemberg, King Frederick I dissolved all councils and created a constitutional monarchy within the German Empire, with four votes in the Federal Council (German: Bundesrat) and 17 in the Imperial Diet (German: Reichstag). The kingdom possessed a bicameral legislature with the upper chamber, (German: Standesherren), being appointed by the King and the lower house, (German: Abgeordnetenhaus), electing its own chairman (after 1874).

The highest executive power rested in the hands of the Ministry of State (German: Staatsministerium), consisting of six ministers: Justice, Foreign Affairs (with the royal household, railways, posts and telegraphs), Interior, Public Worship and Education, War, and Finance. There was no official Prime Minister in Württemberg until 1876, when the Mittnacht Government was reconsolidated. The Ministers who emerged as speakers in the State Parliament were generally regarded by their contemporaries as primus inter pares of the Ministerial Council, and the respective governments were named after these Ministers.

The kingdom ended with the abdication of King William II in November 1918, but the political system experienced no further convulsions of a serious character, with a constitution that resembled those of the other German states.

=== Ministers of Justice ===
- 1806–1809: Adolf von Ende
- 1809–1817: Hans Otto von der Lühe
- 1817–1817: Constantin Franz Fürchtegott von Neurath
- 1818–1831: Eugen von Maucler
- 1831–1839: Karl Heinrich von Schwab
- 1839–1848: Heinrich von Prieser
- 1848–1849: Friedrich von Römer
- 1849–1850: Hermann Friedrich von Haenlein
- 1850–1856: Wilhelm August von Plessen
- 1856–1864: Karl von Waechter-Spittler
- 1864–1867: Constantin Franz von Neurath
- 1867–1878: Hermann von Mittnacht
- 1878–1896: Eduard von Faber
- 1896–1906: Wilhelm August von Breitling
- 1906–1917: Friedrich von Schmidlin
- 1917–1918: Karl von Mandry
- 1918–1918: Theodor Gottfried Liesching

== See ==
- Kingdom of Württemberg
