= 122nd Fusilier Regiment (Württemberg) =

Standard-bearer of Fusilier Regiment (4th Württemberg) No. 122, from “Uniforms of the Old Army” cigarette cards, published in 1932 by the Waldorf-Astoria cigarette factory.

The 122nd Fusiliers (4th Württemberg), named "Kaiser Franz Josef von Österreich, König von Ungarn" (Emperor Franz Josef of Austria, King of Hungary) were an infantry regiment of the Army of Württemberg. The regiment was formed as fusiliers in 1807. In 1906 it was named after Emperor Francis Joseph I of Austria-Hungary. The regiment took part in Napoleon's Russian campaign, the Austro-Prussian War, and Franco-Prussian War. In World War I it was part of the 26th (1st Württemberg) Division. The regiment was disbanded 1 May 1919, 5th and 7th Company/13th Infantry were bearing its tradition in the new Reichsheer.
