= Ministry of Interior of Württemberg =

Ministry of the Kingdom of Württemberg

The Ministry of Interior of Württemberg (German: Württembergisches Innenministerium) was a ministry of the Kingdom of Württemberg, that existed from 1806 to 1919

== History ==
The official title was the Minister of State in the Department of the Interior.

=== Kingdom of Württemberg ===
Upon the establishment of the Kingdom of Württemberg, King Frederick I dissolved all councils and created a constitutional monarchy within the German Empire, with four votes in the Federal Council (German: Bundesrat) and 17 in the Imperial Diet (German: Reichstag). The kingdom possessed a bicameral legislature with the upper chamber, (German: Standesherren), being appointed by the King and the lower house, (German: Abgeordnetenhaus), electing its own chairman (after 1874).

The highest executive power rested in the hands of the Ministry of State (German: Staatsministerium), consisting of six ministers: Justice, Foreign Affairs (with the royal household, railways, posts and telegraphs), Interior, Public Worship and Education, War, and Finance. There was no official Prime Minister in Württemberg until 1876, when the Mittnacht Government was reconsolidated. The Ministers who emerged as speakers in the State Parliament were generally regarded by their contemporaries as primus inter pares of the Ministerial Council, and the respective governments were named after these Ministers.

The kingdom ended with the abdication of King William II in November 1918, but the political system experienced no further convulsions of a serious character, with a constitution that resembled those of the other German states.

== Interior Ministers ==
Kingdom of Württemberg

- 1806–1812: Philipp Christian von Normann-Ehrenfels
- 1812–1816: Karl von Reischach
- 1816–1817: Karl Eberhard von Wächter
- 1817–1817: Karl von Kerner
- 1817–1821: Christian Friedrich von Otto
- 1821–1830: Christoph Friedrich von Schmidlin
- 1831–1832: Sixt Eberhard von Kapff
- 1832–1832: Jakob Friedrich Weishaar
- 1832–1848: Johannes von Schlayer
- 1848–1848: Joseph von Linden
- 1848–1849: Gustav von Duvernoy
- 1849–1850: Johannes von Schlayer
- 1850–1864: Joseph von Linden
- 1864–1870: Ernst von Geßler
- 1870–1872: Karl von Scheurlen
- 1872–1872: Theodor von Gessler
- 1872–1881: Heinrich von Sick
- 1881–1887: Julius von Hölder
- 1887–1893: Karl von Schmid
- 1893–1912: Johann von Pischek
- 1912–1918: Karl von Fleischhauer
- 1918–1918: Ludwig von Köhler

People's State of Württemberg

- 1918–1919: Arthur Crispien
- 1919–1919: Hugo Lindemann
- 1919–1920: Berthold Heymann
- 1920–1923: Eugen Graf
- 1923–1933: Eugen Bolz
- 1933–1933: Wilhelm Murr
- 1933–1945: Jonathan Schmid
