= Schottenstein =

Schottenstein may refer to:

== People ==
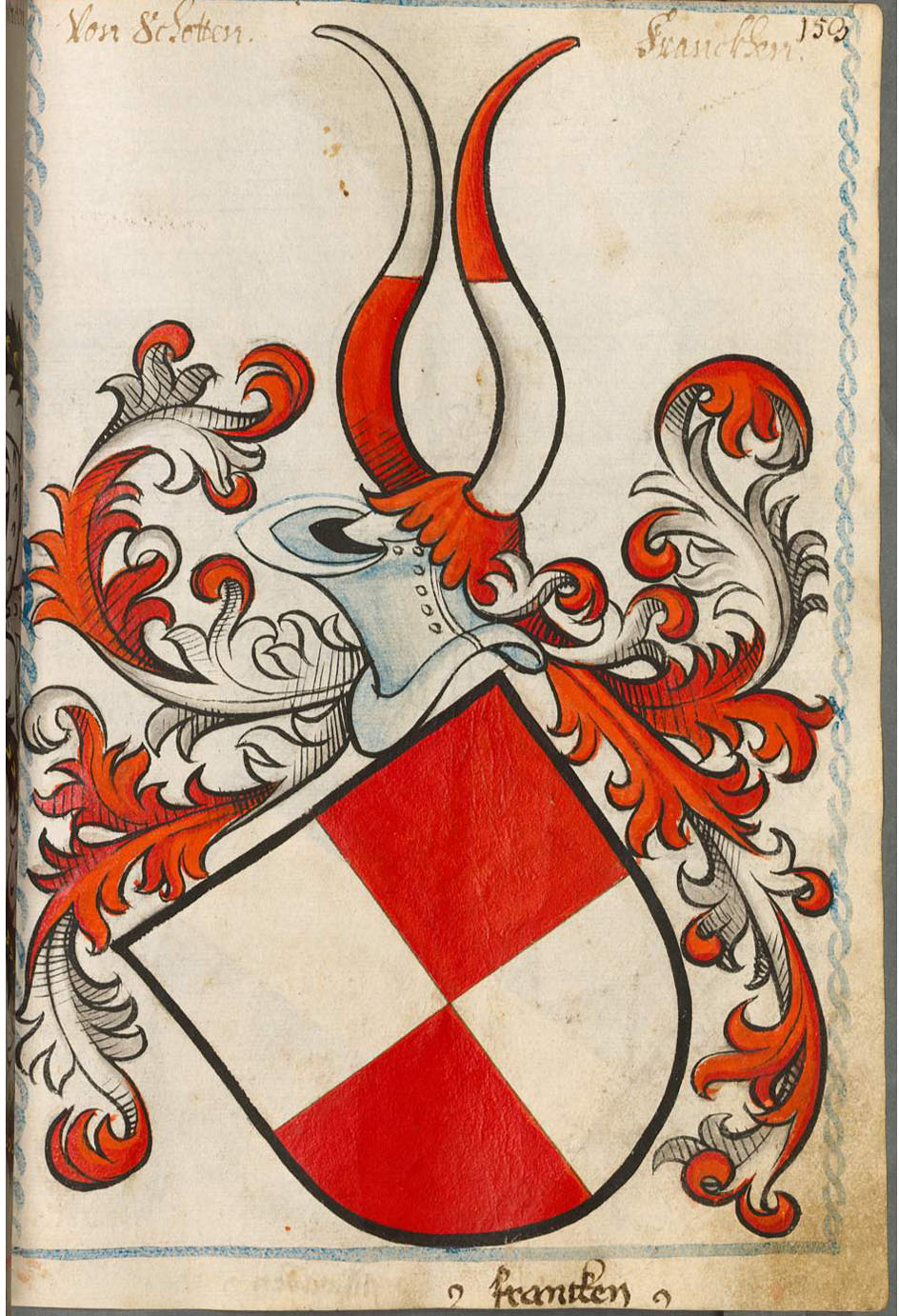
Coat of arms from the Scheibler Armorial

=== Individuals ===
- Melvin L. Schottenstein (1932-1993), American Jewish Entrepreneur and Community Leader in Columbus, Ohio having founded a Law Practice and a Public National Homebuilding Company, M/I Homes
- Eduard Schott von Schottenstein (1822–1897), German civil servant
- Jerome Schottenstein (1926–1992), American Jewish entrepreneur and philanthropist
- Karl Schott von Schottenstein (1792–1882), Württemberg politician
- Konrad Schott von Schottenstein (d. 1526), Margravial Bailiff and Burgrave of Rothenberg
- Lutz Schott von Schottenstein (d. 1484), Frankish nobleman
- Max Schott von Schottenstein (1836–1917), Württemberg general and minister

=== Noble families ===
- House of Schott von Schottenstein, a German noble family

== Businesses and organizations ==
- Schottenstein's, former American department store chain
- Jerome Schottenstein Center, multi-purpose arena on the campus of Ohio State University, in Columbus, Ohio
- Schottenstein Stores Corp., Columbus, Ohio, a holding company

== Other uses ==
- Schottenstein campus, the future building of the Israel Antiquities Authority
- The Schottenstein Talmud
- Schottenstein Prize in Cardiovascular Sciences
- Schottenstein Center, Ohio 2005, 2015 live album by Bruce Springsteen
- Nuremberg v. Konrad Schott von Schottenstein
