= Ministry of War of Württemberg =

Ministry of the Kingdom of Württemberg

The Ministry of War of Württemberg (German: Württembergisches Kriegsministerium) was a ministry of the Kingdom of Württemberg, that existed from 1806 to 1919. It was located in Stuttgart at Olgastraße 13.

== History ==
The predecessor of the Ministry of War, the Kriegsratskollegium, was established on 14 March 1705. Each of the four German kingdoms (Württemberg, Prussia, Saxony and Bavaria) continued, according to an 1870 military treaty, to have their own war ministries from the Unification of Germany until the adoption of the 1919 Weimar Constitution, that provided for a unified, federal ministry of defence.

=== Kingdom of Württemberg ===
Upon the establishment of the Kingdom of Württemberg, King Frederick I dissolved all councils and created a constitutional monarchy within the German Empire, with four votes in the Federal Council (German: Bundesrat) and 17 in the Imperial Diet (German: Reichstag). The kingdom possessed a bicameral legislature with the upper chamber, (German: Standesherren), being appointed by the King and the lower house, (German: Abgeordnetenhaus), electing its own chairman (after 1874).

The highest executive power rested in the hands of the Ministry of State (German: Staatsministerium), consisting of six ministers: Justice, Foreign Affairs (with the royal household, railways, posts and telegraphs), Interior, Public Worship and Education, War, and Finance. There was no official Prime Minister in Württemberg until 1876, when the Mittnacht Government was reconsolidated. The Ministers who emerged as speakers in the State Parliament were generally regarded by their contemporaries as primus inter pares of the Ministerial Council, and the respective governments were named after these Ministers.

The kingdom ended with the abdication of King William II in November 1918, but the political system experienced no further convulsions of a serious character, with a constitution that resembled those of the other German states.

=== Organization ===
As of 1806, the Ministry was organized with a President, Vice-President, six councils, two secretaries, two clerks and a registrar. The Department of War (German: Departement des Kriegswesens) was renamed War Department (German: Kriegsdepartement) in 1811 and was now subordinate to a "President" with a "Vice President". From 1822 the War Department was called the War Council (German: Kriegsrat) and was directly subordinate to the Minister of War. In 1829 the War Council was dissolved.

=== Leaders ===
Presidents of the Department of War/War Council

- 1806–1806: Ferdinand Friedrich von Nicolai
- 1806–1811: Duke William Frederick Philip of Württemberg
- 1811–1816: Friedrich von Phull
- 1817–1829: Ernst von Hügel

Minister of War

- 1806–1815: Duke William Frederick Philip of Württemberg
- 1816–1829: Frederic von Franquemont
- 1829–1842: Ernst von Hügel
- 1842–1848: Johann Georg von Sontheim
- 1848–1849: August von Rüpplin
- 1849–1850: Fidel von Baur-Breitenfeld
- 1850–1865: Moriz von Miller
- 1865–1866: Kuno von Wiederhold
- 1866–1867: Oskar von Hardegg
- 1867–1870: Rudolf von Wagner-Frommenhausen
- 1870–1874: Albert von Suckow
- 1874–1883: Theodor von Wundt
- 1883–1892: Gustav von Steinheil
- 1892–1901: Max Schott von Schottenstein
- 1901–1906: Albert von Schurlen
- 1906–1918: Otto von Marchtaler
- 1918–1918: vacant
- 1918–1918: Albert Schreiner
- 1918–1919: Ulrich Fischer
- 1919–1919: Immanuel Herrmann

=== Office ===
The office of the War Ministry was in Stuttgart at Olgastraße 13.

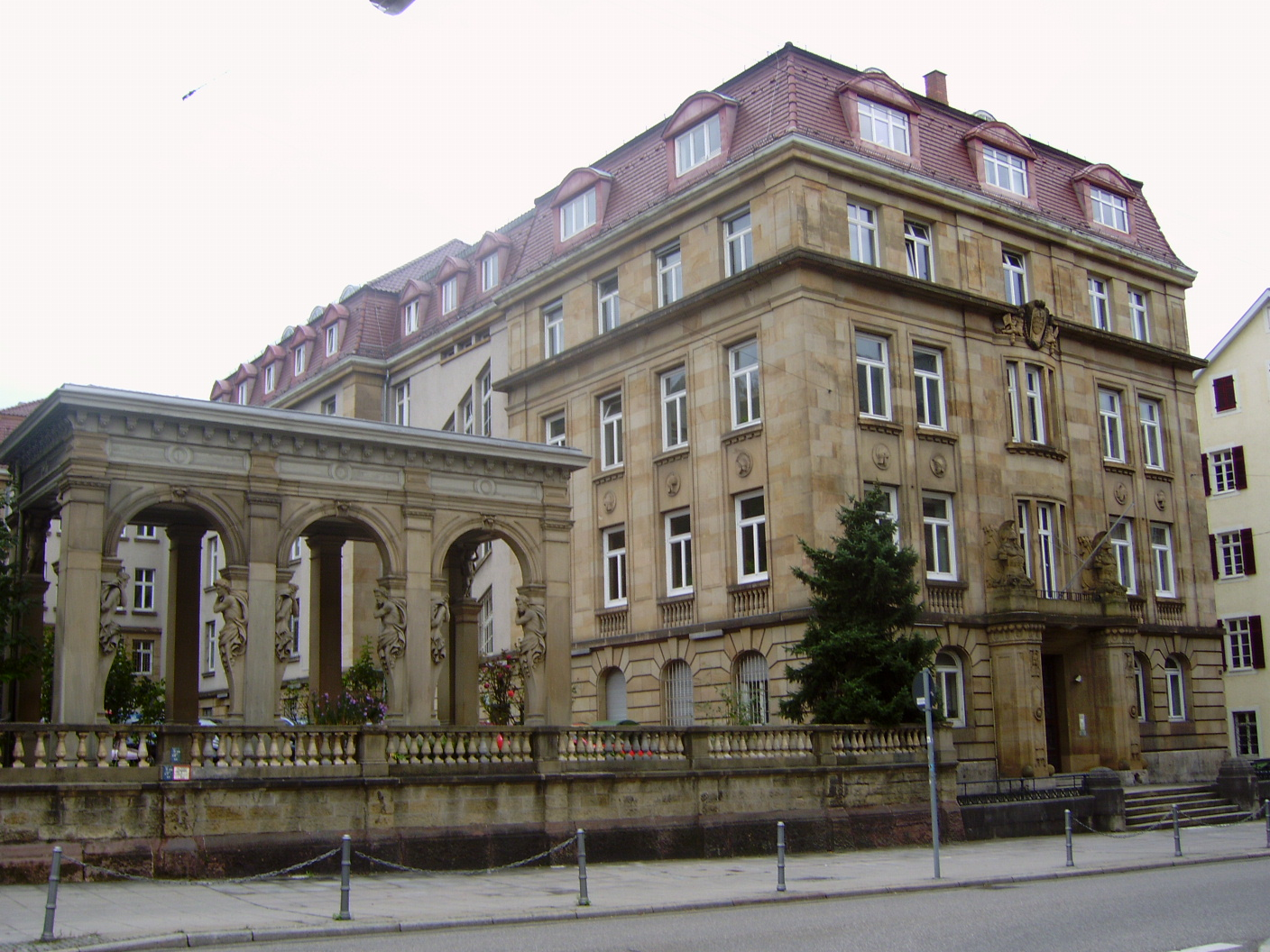

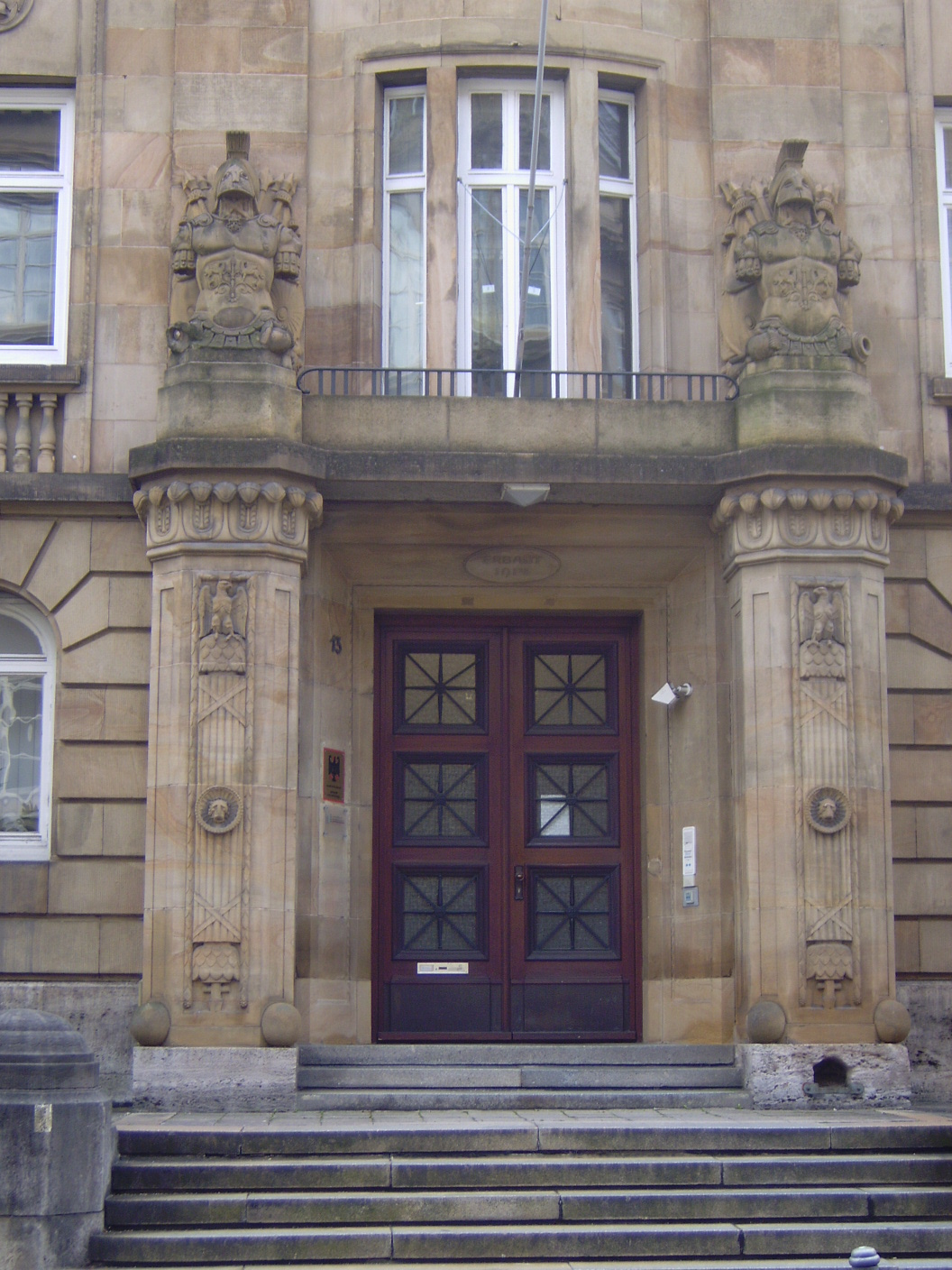

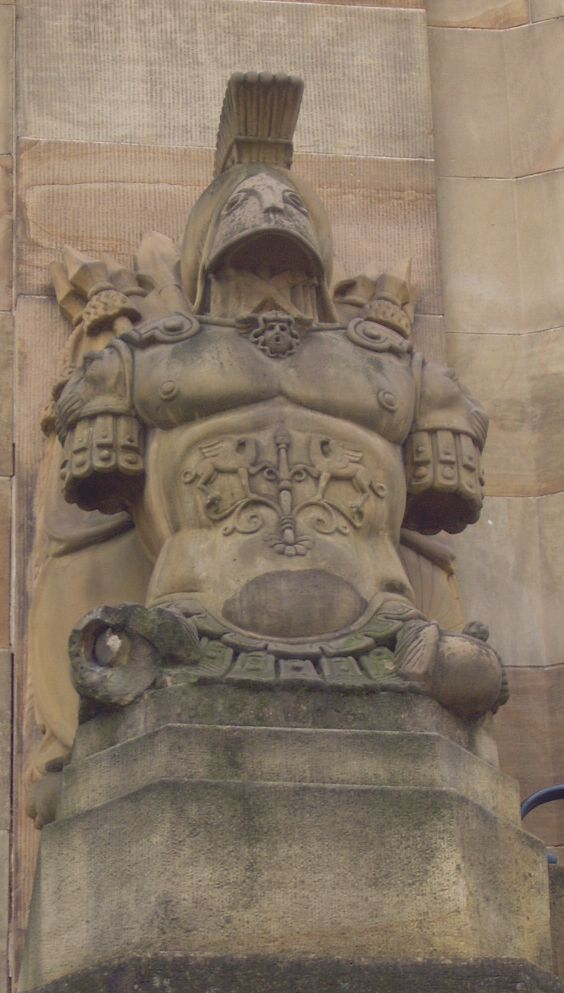

== See also ==
- Kingdom of Württemberg
