= Württemberg gulden =

Württemberg used the South German gulden as its currency until 1873. Until 1824, the Gulden was a unit of account and was used to denominate banknotes but was not issued as a coin. It was worth 5/12 of a Conventionsthaler and was subdivided into 50 Conventionskreuzer or 60 Kreuzer Landmünze.

The first Gulden coins were issued in 1824. The new Gulden was equal to the earlier Gulden and was subdivided into 60 Kreuzer. The rather unusual denominations of 12 and 24 Kreuzer were issued, replacing the 10 and 20 Conventionskreuzer coins.

In 1837, Baden joined the South German Monetary Union. This caused the Gulden to be reduced slightly in size, as it was now worth four sevenths of a Prussian Thaler.

The Gulden was replaced by the Mark in 1873, at a rate of 1 Mark = 35 Kreuzer.
