= Rahl =

Rahl is a surname. Notable people with the surname include:

- Carl Rahl (1812–1865), Austrian painter
- Mady Rahl (1915–2009), German stage and film actress

== The Sword of Truth fictional characters ==
- Darken Rahl
- Jennsen Rahl
- Richard Rahl
- Nathan Rahl
- Oba Rahl
- Panis Rahl
