= Christian Friedrich von Otto =

Christian Friedrich von Otto (26 October 1758 – 8 September 1836) was a Württemberger official and politician.

== Life and career ==
Otto was born on 26 October 1758 in Dettingen unter Teck, as the son of a Protestant minister. After attending high school in Stuttgart, he studied law with Carl Christopher Hofacker (1749–1793) at the University of Tübingen. Later, he moved to the University of Strasbourg and focused on the Supreme Court in Colmar with French law. This helped him prepare his dissertation, and in 1780 he obtained his doctorate and worked as a lawyer.

== Career ==
In 1786, he became secretary of Charles Eugene, Duke of Württemberg. In 1792, he was appointed Minister and assessor of the court. He later established the Kingdom of Württemberg. After 1806, he took over the Police Department of the Upper Württemberg and the Regional Economics College.

=== Napoleonic Wars ===
During the Napoleonic Wars, he added the position of Commissioner-General for supply of foreign troops. This included the management of financial and material logistics and the hospital system. In 1811, he became Head of the Local Government and a member of the newly established Württemberg State Council. In 1814 he acquired the Grand Cross of Civil Merit Württemberg, which was connected with German nobility. In 1815, he took care of the financial compensation of the troops stationed in France the Württemberg army and the army of the Grand Duchy of Hesse by the French Treasury. In 1818 he acquired the Order of the Crown (Württemberg).

From 8 November 1816 to 10 November 1817, Otto served as Minister of Finance of Württemberg. From 10 November 1817 to 29 July 1821, he served as Interior Minister. From 29 July 1821 to 15 November 1831, he succeeded Hans Otto von der Lühe to serve as President of the Privy Council. He was succeeded by Baron Eugen von Maucler.

== Personal life ==
He died in Stuttgart on 8 September 1836.
