= Ministry of Foreign Affairs of Württemberg =

Ministry of the Kingdom of Württemberg

The Ministry of Foreign Affairs of Württemberg (German: Württembergischer Außenminister) was a ministry of the Kingdom of Württemberg, that existed from 1806 to 1919.

== History ==
The position was also called the "Minister of the Royal House and of Foreign Affairs."

=== Kingdom of Württemberg ===
Upon the establishment of the Kingdom of Württemberg, King Frederick I dissolved all councils and created a constitutional monarchy within the German Empire, with four votes in the Federal Council (German: Bundesrat) and 17 in the Imperial Diet (German: Reichstag). The kingdom possessed a bicameral legislature with the upper chamber, (German: Standesherren), being appointed by the King and the lower house, (German: Abgeordnetenhaus), electing its own chairman (after 1874).

The highest executive power rested in the hands of the Ministry of State (German: Staatsministerium), consisting of six ministers: Justice, Foreign Affairs (with the royal household, railways, posts and telegraphs), Interior, Public Worship and Education, War, and Finance. There was no official Prime Minister in Württemberg until 1876, when the Mittnacht Government was reconsolidated. The Ministers who emerged as speakers in the State Parliament were generally regarded by their contemporaries as primus inter pares of the Ministerial Council, and the respective governments were named after these Ministers.

The kingdom ended with the abdication of King William II in November 1918, but the political system experienced no further convulsions of a serious character, with a constitution that resembled those of the other German states.

=== Ministers of Foreign Affairs ===
- 1806–1807: Georg Ernst Levin von Wintzingerode
- 1807–1812: Ludwig von Taube
- 1812–1814: Ferdinand Ludwig von Zeppelin
- 1814–1816: Georg Ernst Levin von Wintzingerode
- 1816–1819: Ferdinand Ludwig von Zeppelin
- 1819–1823: Heinrich Levin von Wintzingerode
- 1823–1848: Joseph Ignaz von Beroldingen
- 1848–1849: Karl von Roser
- 1849–1850: Karl von Wächter-Spittler
- 1850–1851: Joseph von Linden
- 1851–1854: Constantin Franz von Neurath
- 1854–1855: Joseph von Linden
- 1855–1864: Karl Eugen von Hügel
- 1864–1870: Karl von Varnbüler
- 1870–1871: Adolf von Taube
- 1871–1873: August von Wächter
- 1873–1900: Hermann von Mittnacht
- 1900–1906: Julius von Soden
- 1906–1918: Karl von Weizsäcker
- 1918–1918: Theodor Liesching
- 1918–1920: Wilhelm Blos

=== List of treaties of the Kingdom of Württemberg ===
- Act for the Organization of the German Confederation
- Bavaria–Württemberg Customs Union Treaty
- Dresden Coinage Convention
- Geneva Convention (1864)
- Munich Coinage Treaty
- Paris Declaration Respecting Maritime Law
- Saint Petersburg Declaration of 1868
- Treaty of Fulda
- Treaty of the Confederation of the Rhine
- Vienna Monetary Treaty
- Zollverein Treaties

== See ==
- Kingdom of Württemberg
