= Treaty of Fulda =

1813 treaty between Württemberg and Austria

- Signed: November 2, 1813; 212 years ago
- Signatories: Frederick I of Württemberg; Klemens Wenzel Nepomuk Lothar von Metternich

The Treaty of Fulda was signed on November 2, 1813, at Fulda, Hesse, in Germany. It was signed by King Frederick I of Württemberg and Austrian foreign minister Klemens Wenzel Nepomuk Lothar von Metternich after the Battle of Leipzig. Based on the terms of the treaty, Württemberg was no longer a member of the Confederation of the Rhine.
