= Hermann von Mittnacht =

German lawyer and first official Prime Minister of the Kingdom of Württemberg

Hermann von Mittnacht Freiherr von Mittnacht
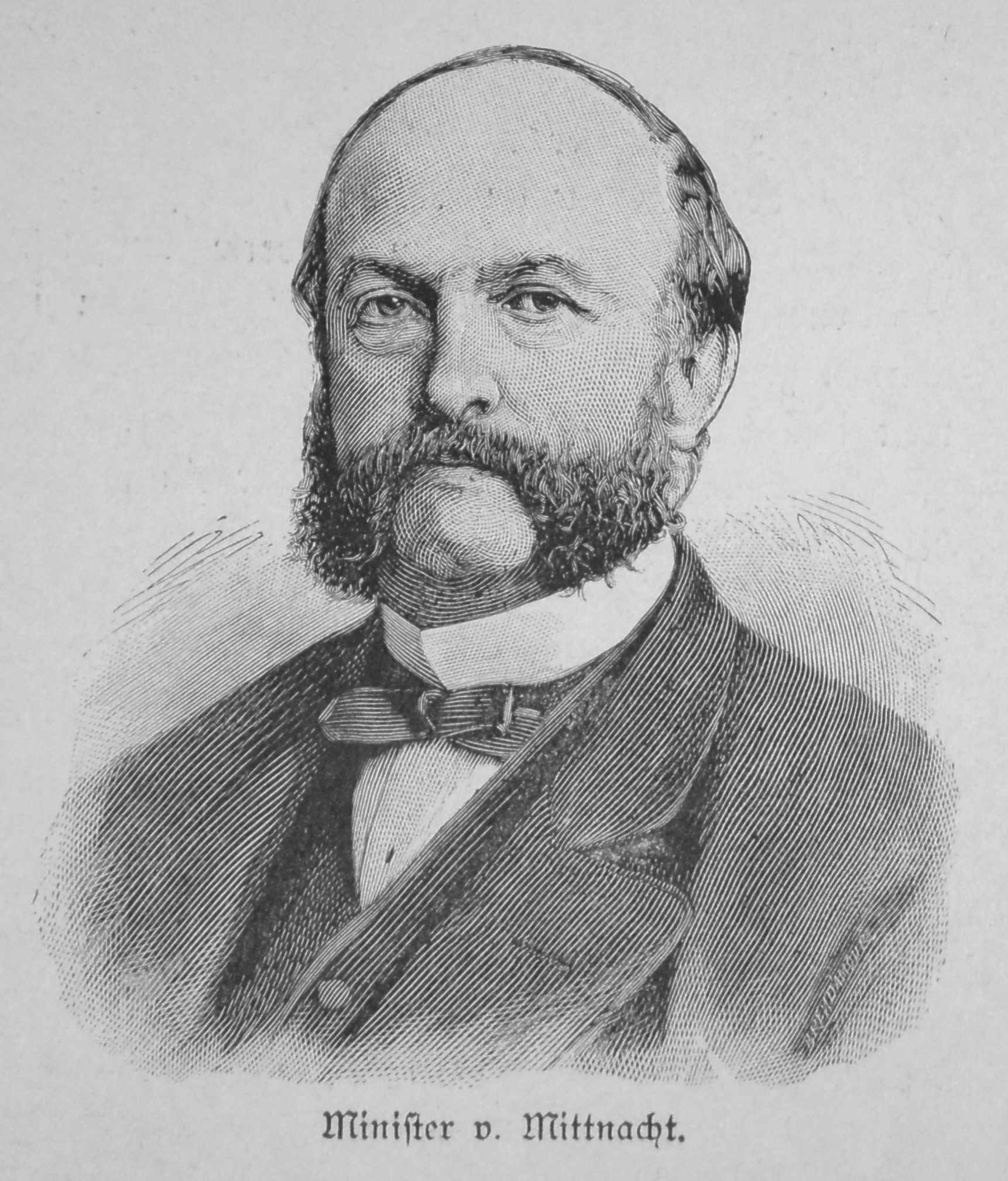

Minister-President of the Kingdom of Württemberg
- In office 1876–1900
- Monarch: Charles I
- Preceded by: Inaugural holder
- Succeeded by: Max Schott von Schottenstein

Minister of Foreign Affairs of Württemberg
- In office 1873–1900
- Preceded by: August von Wächter
- Succeeded by: Julius von Soden

Minister of Justice of Württemberg
- In office 1867–1878
- Preceded by: Constantin Franz von Neurath
- Succeeded by: Eduard von Faber

Personal details
- Born: Hermann Carl Friedrich Mittnacht; 17 March 1825; Stuttgart, Kingdom of Württemberg
- Died: 2 May 1909 (aged 84); Friedrichshafen
- Spouse: Angelika Bucher (after 1854)
- Children: 4

Hermann Carl Friedrich Mittnacht (from 1887 Freiherr von Mittnacht; 17 March 1825 – 2 May 1909) was a German lawyer who was the first official Prime Minister of the Kingdom of Württemberg.

== Early life ==
Mittnacht was born on 17 March 1825 in Stuttgart. He was the son of Magdalene (née Sulzbeck) Mittnacht (1791–1829) and Franz Jakob Mittnacht (1781-1849), a Württemberg civil servant from the New Württemberg area. His paternal grandparents were Johann Michael Mittnacht, a forester from a farming family in Reisfeld (near Igersheim), and Eva Katherine (née Bender) Mittnacht. His maternal grandparents were Magdalene the daughter of Col. Sergeant Heinrich Sulzbeck from Würzburg and Magdalene (née Brunbauer) Sulzbeck.

== Career ==
After attending high school in Stuttgart, Mittnacht studied law at the University of Tübingen and University of Heidelberg from 1842 to 1848. During his studies he became a member of the Corps Suevia Tübingen in 1843 and the Corps Guestphalia Heidelberg in 1844. After joining the Württemberg judiciary in 1849 and assisting at various court locations, he became Senior Justice Assessor (German: Obertribunalrat) in 1854 and Public Prosecutor in Ellwangen in 1857.

=== Political career ===
From 1861 to 1900, Mittnacht was a Deputy for the Oberamt Mergentheim in the lower house (German: Abgeordnetenhaus) of the Württemberg. He was conservative-minded, but did not belong to a specific party. In 1862, he became a Municipal Judge in Stuttgart, from 1864 with the title of Supreme Judicial Councilor (German: Oberjustizrat) and in 1865 he was promoted to the Supreme Court Council. In 1867, Mittnacht became Minister of Justice under the "Senior Minister" Karl von Varnbüler. He was much more committed than Varnbüler in the negotiations on the accession of the Kingdom of Württemberg to the newly emerging German Reich. From 1868 to 1870, he was a member of the constituency of Württemberg (Gerabronn, Crailsheim, Mergentheim) to the Customs Parliament. After Varnbüler's resignation in autumn 1870, Mittnacht became the de facto head of the Württemberg government (President of the Privy Council and Chairman of the Council of Ministers).

In 1873, as successor to Freiherr von Wächter, he also became Foreign Minister and, in 1876, the first Prime Minister of the Kingdom of Württemberg (official title: President of the State Ministry). The successful creation of an Independent State Ministry in 1876 marked the effective independence of the Württemberg government from the King. In 1878, Mittnacht was succeeded as Minister of Justice by Eduard von Faber.

Mittnacht, who was sympathetic to Greater Germany at the beginning of his political career, had been loyal to the German Reich since 1871. In the spirit of the royal couple King Charles I and Queen Olga, however, he paid attention to maintaining the Federal structure of the Empire, in particular by sticking to important reserve rights for the Kingdom of Württemberg (e.g. Württemberg's own foreign ministry, its own legations abroad, its own Army, its own taxes as well as its own postal and railway system). Nevertheless, he became Otto von Bismarck's confidante, even remaining close to Bismarck after his resignation as Chancellor in 1890.

Mittnacht was a respected authority in the Bundesrat in Berlin. At home in Stuttgart, Mittnacht managed in a very pragmatic way between the politically disinterested King Charles and the State Parliament to be the effective leader of the kingdom throughout Charles' reign and, thus, set it on the path to a constitutional monarchy. He based his politics on the pro-government "state party" and the German National Liberal Party. What is remarkable is the fact that he was able to do all this in a predominantly Protestant-Swabian country, although he himself was Catholic and also of Franconian descent.

In 1900, Mittnacht resigned from all his government offices and the State Parliament due to his advanced age and illness, choosing to spend his retirement in Friedrichshafen on Lake Constance. He was succeeded as Minister of Foreign Affairs by Baron Julius von Soden.

== Personal life ==
In 1854, Mittnacht married Angelika Bucher (1835–1910), the daughter of Caroline (née Härlin) Bucher and Franz Bucher (1798–1859), a member of the Württemberg State Parliament from Ellwangen. The couple had four children.

Mittnacht died on 2 May 1909 in Friedrichshafen.
