= Theodor Gottfried Liesching =

German jurist and politician

Theodor Gottfried Liesching (14 August 1865 – 25 July 1922) was a German jurist and politician. He was born in Stuttgart and died in Böblingen. Liesching served as the final Minister President of the Kingdom of Wüttemberg in 1918.

== Life ==
He was the son of the bookseller Hermann Theodor Liesching (1821–1871) and Caecilie Susanne Luise Regenbrecht (1840–1915), and was a member of the Evangelical-Lutheran Church in Württemberg. After attending high school in Stuttgart, he studied law in Tübingen and Breslau. In Tübingen he was a member of the Coburger Convent der akademischen Landsmannschaften und Turnerschaften. Liesching practiced law in Stuttgart in 1890–91 and in Tübingen from 1891 to 1917. From 1917 to 1918 he served as senior executive at the Württemberg Embassy in Berlin.

== Politics ==
From 1901 to 1918 he held a parliamentary seat in the Estates of Württemberg. From 1912 to 1918, he also belonged to the Reichstag, where he represented Württemberg. Liesching was nominated in 1912 as a joint candidate of the National Liberal Party (Germany) and the Progressive People's Party (Germany). In the runoff, he won with the help of the Social Democrats against the German Conservative Party candidate.

From 7 to 9 November 1918, Liesching was the last Minister-President of the Kingdom of Württemberg. As a member of the Progressive People's Party (which had joined the Democratic People's Party (Germany)), he worked at the end of 1918 on the founding of the German Democratic Party.

From 10 November 1918 to 20 February 1922 he served as finance minister in the cabinets of Wilhelm Blos and Johannes von Hieber. From 1919 to 1920 he was a member of the Württemberg Constituent National Assembly, and from 1920 to 1922 the Württemberg Landtag. He died in 1922.
