= Army of Württemberg =

Württembergian Army
- Württembergische Armee (German)
- Infantry standard of Württemberg
- Active: 1806 - 1918
- Disbanded: 9 November 1918
- Country: Kingdom of Württemberg
- Allegiance: House of Württemberg
- Type: Army
- Size: 9.900 men (1806) 30.000 men (1815)
- Part of: Imperial German Army (1871–1918)
- Engagements: Seven Years' War Coalition Wars: French Revolutionary Wars; War of the First Coalition; War of the Second Coalition; Napoleonic Wars; War of the Third Coalition; War of the Sixth Coalition; Baden Revolution; Dano-Prussian War; Austro-Prussian War; Franco-Prussian War Great War

Commanders
- Notable commanders: Duke Albrecht Duke Louis of Württemberg

The Württembergian Army (German: Württembergische Armee) served as the army of the Kingdom of Württemberg.

The Württembergian Army had its permanent beginnings in the Peace of Westphalia that followed the Thirty Years' War, which permitted states of the Holy Roman Empire to raise standing armies. These troops were, particularly in the 18th century, sometimes used in Soldatenhandel and lent to foreign powers; this practice was often criticized as a form of mercenary service.

== Württemberg army in the Napoleonic Wars ==
In 1806, with the creation of the Confederation of the Rhine, the Württemberg army stood at around 9,900 personnel with 6 infantry regiments, 3 cavalry regiments and 2 garde regiments, one for infantry and cavalry. The newly crowned King of Württemberg Frederick I made various reforms and expanded the army personnel to around 30,000 men by 1815.

== History ==
When the Imperial German Army was established, around the nucleus of the Prussian Army in 1871, the Württembergian army remained an independent contingent such as the Bavarian Army and the Royal Saxon Army. It was formed into the XIII (Royal Württemberg) Corps until 1918, mainly comprising the 26th and 27th infantry divisions and the 26th dragoon regiment.

== See also ==
- History of Württemberg
- Kingdom of Württemberg
