= Old Württemberg =

German princely territory of Württemberg

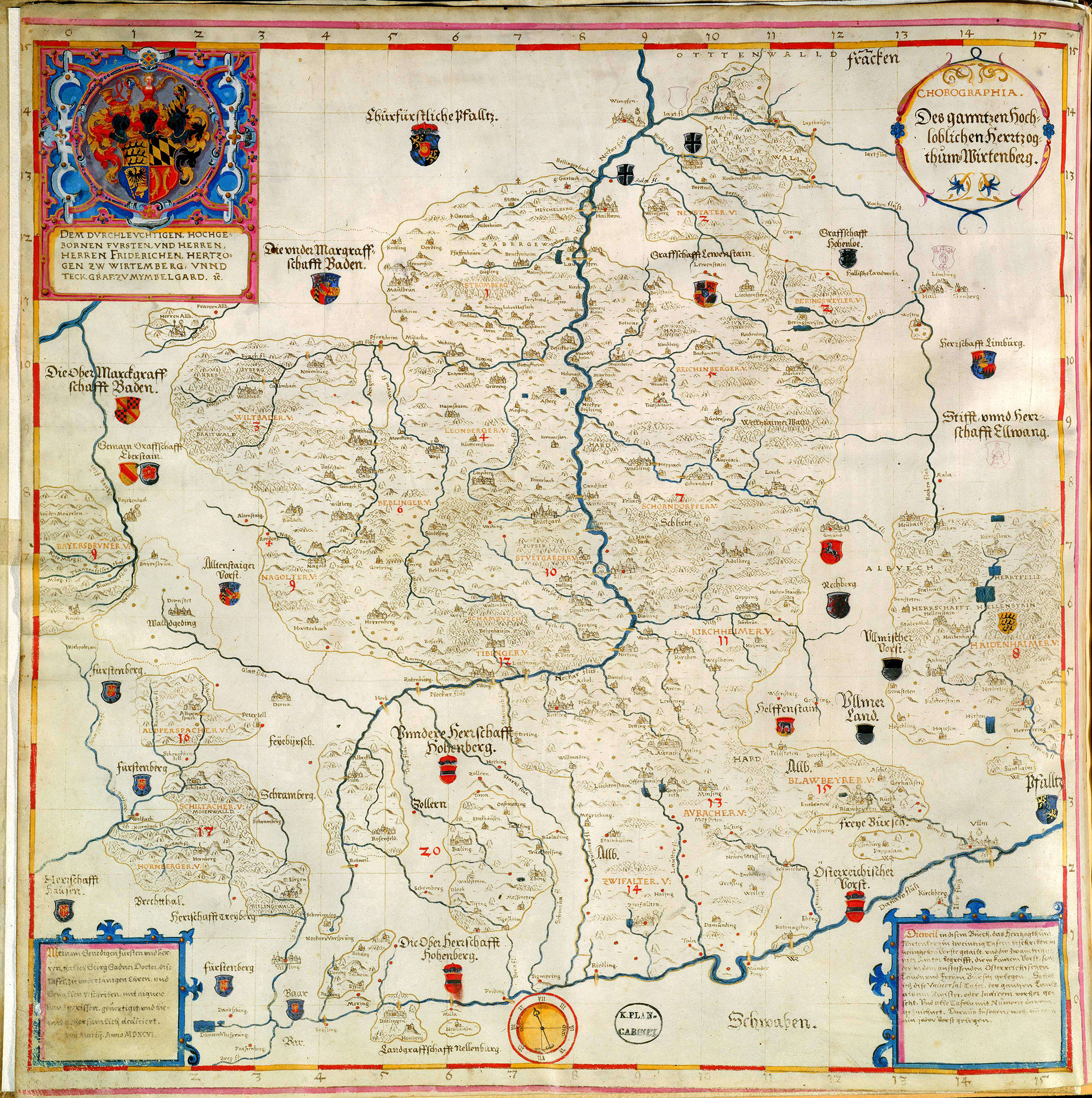
The Duchy of Württemberg in 1596: places under foreign lordship have been marked with a red dot by Gadner

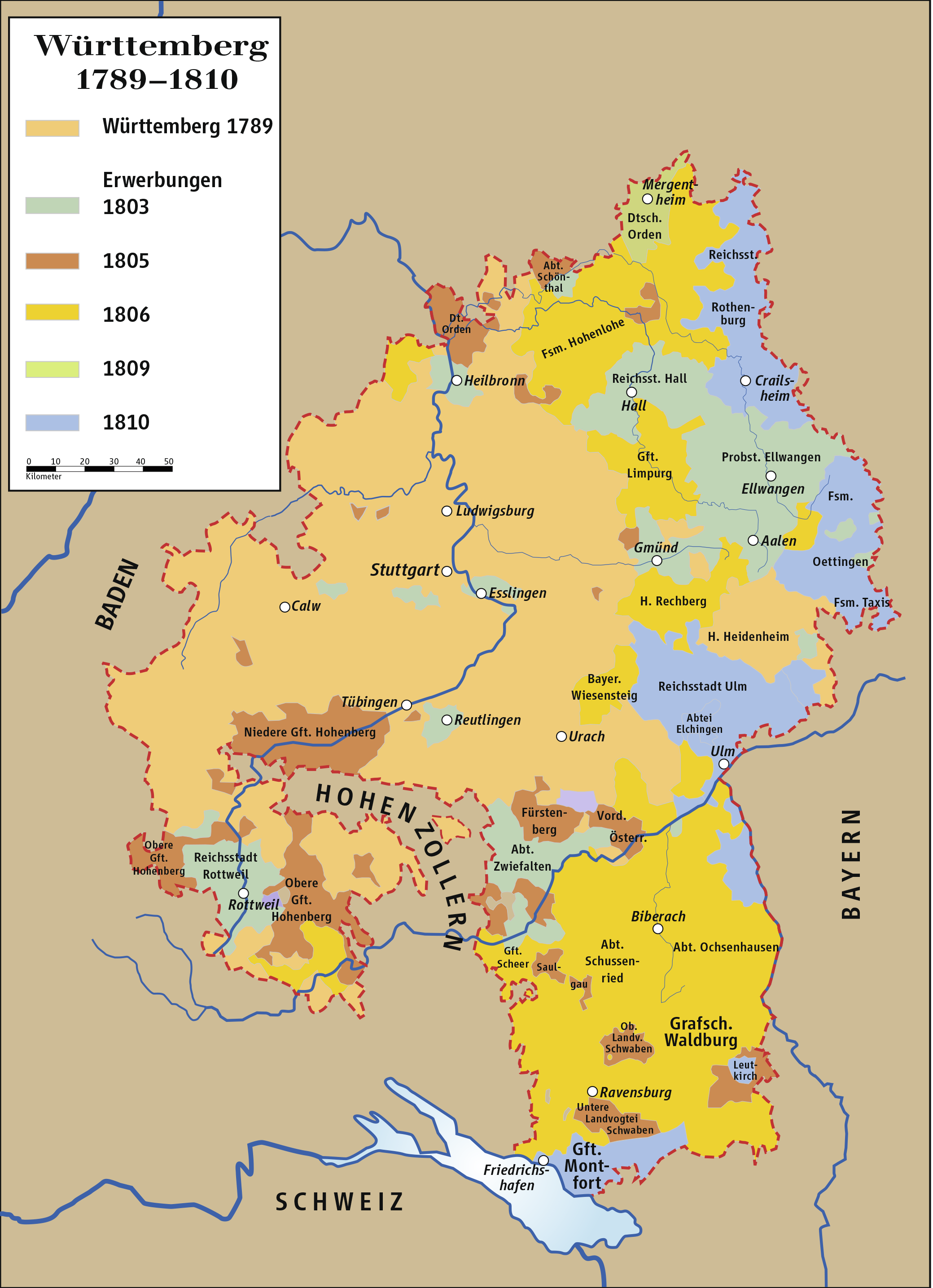
Old Württemberg in 1789 – expanded by the gains resulting from the 1803 Reichsdeputationshauptschluss

Old Württemberg (German: Altwürttemberg) was the princely territory of Württemberg prior to the imperial treaty or Reichsdeputationshauptschluss of 1803, as opposed to the New Württemberg which followed and which acquired a large number of additional territories – especially to the east and south of Old Württemberg.

== Geographic structure ==
Old Württemberg was made up of those regions that had belonged to the Duchy of Württemberg prior to 1803. These included the former County of Württemberg in the heartland on the Middle Neckar and the additional territories it had gained: the counties of Calw, Mömpelgard, Tübingen, Urach and Vaihingen, the baronies of Heidenheim and Teck, the inherited Reichslehen or imperial fief of Grüningen, and numerous smaller lordships as well as the many ecclesial territories, that Dukes Ulrich and Christoph had seized and secularised in the wake of the Reformation.

Independent "islands" on Württemberg soil were the imperial towns of Heilbronn, Esslingen, Weil der Stadt, Reutlingen, and the expansive Ulm on the southeastern edge as well as several secular lordships whose locations are marked by Georg Gadner on his overview map of 1596 as red dots. Until 1803 Württemberg was one of the few Protestant territories that had a seat and vote in the Circle of Swabia.

== Political structure ==
There had been a university in Tubingen since 1477. Its founder, Count Eberhard im Bart, was elevated to a duke in 1495. Following the Poor Conrad uprising, the 1514 Treaty of Tübingen came into force, which was intended to influence the constitution of Württemberg for centuries. For example, until 1805 the Duchy had a parliamentary assembly dominated by patricians and prelates that restricted the rights and fiscal policies of the duke, however since the Reformation there had been no political forum (such as the Landstände) of organised nobility, because the former estate-owning aristocracy had largely remained Roman Catholic, had placed themselves directly under the Holy Roman Emperor as imperial knights and no longer saw themselves owing fealty to the Duke of Württemberg.

From 1803 to the final dissolution of the Holy Roman Empire in 1806 there was, for a short time, an independent state of New Württemberg with its governmental seat in Ellwangen, in which the Landstände or the Ständeversammlung (parliamentary assembly) of Old Württemberg had no voice. Both states were ruled by Prince-Elector and Duke Frederick I of Württemberg in personal union, until they were amalgamated into a kingdom by Napoleon and thus the burdensome estates constitution of Old Württemberg could be officially revoked. The political differentiation between Old and New Württemberg now became obsolete, but was occasionally still used to make a regional distinction.

For example, in the 20th century the name of Old Württemberg surfaced in the naming of the electricity supplier, Kraftwerk Altwürttemberg or i.e. "Old Württemberg Power Station", and in the Bezirksbaugenossenschaft Altwürttemberg ("Old Württemberg District Construction Cooperative"). The Altwürttemberger is also a breed of horse that is threatened by extinction today.

== Literature ==
- Walter Grube: Stände in Württemberg. In: Von der Ständeversammlung zum demokratischen Parlament. Theiss, Stuttgart, 1982, pp. 31–50
- Wolfgang von Hippel: Wirtschafts- und Sozialgeschichte In: Handbuch der Baden-Württembergischen Geschichte. Dritter Band. pp. 486, 519, 722
- Bernhard Mann: Württemberg 1800 bis 1866. In: Handbuch der Baden-Württembergischen Geschichte. Dritter Band. Vom Ende des alten Reiches bis zum Ende der Monarchien Ernst Klett, Stuttgart, 1992, ISBN 3-608-91467-6, pp. 241 ff., 246–251, 254–256, 265–266, 269–275, 287, 295, 330
- Dieter Mertens: Württemberg. In: Handbuch der Baden-Württembergischen Geschichte. Zweiter Band. Die Territorien im alten Reich. Klett-Cotta, Stuttgart, 1995, ISBN 3-608-91466-8, pp. 1–163
