= Kingdom of Württemberg =

Kingdom in Central Europe and state of the German Empire (1806–1918)

Coordinates: 48°30′N 09°30′E

Kingdom of Württemberg Königreich Württemberg (German)
- 1806–1918
- Top: Flag (1806–1819); Bottom: Flag (1819–1918) Coat of arms
- Motto: Furchtlos und treu "Fearless and loyal"
- Anthem: Heil unserem König, Heil "Hail our king, hail"
- The Kingdom of Württemberg within the German Empire

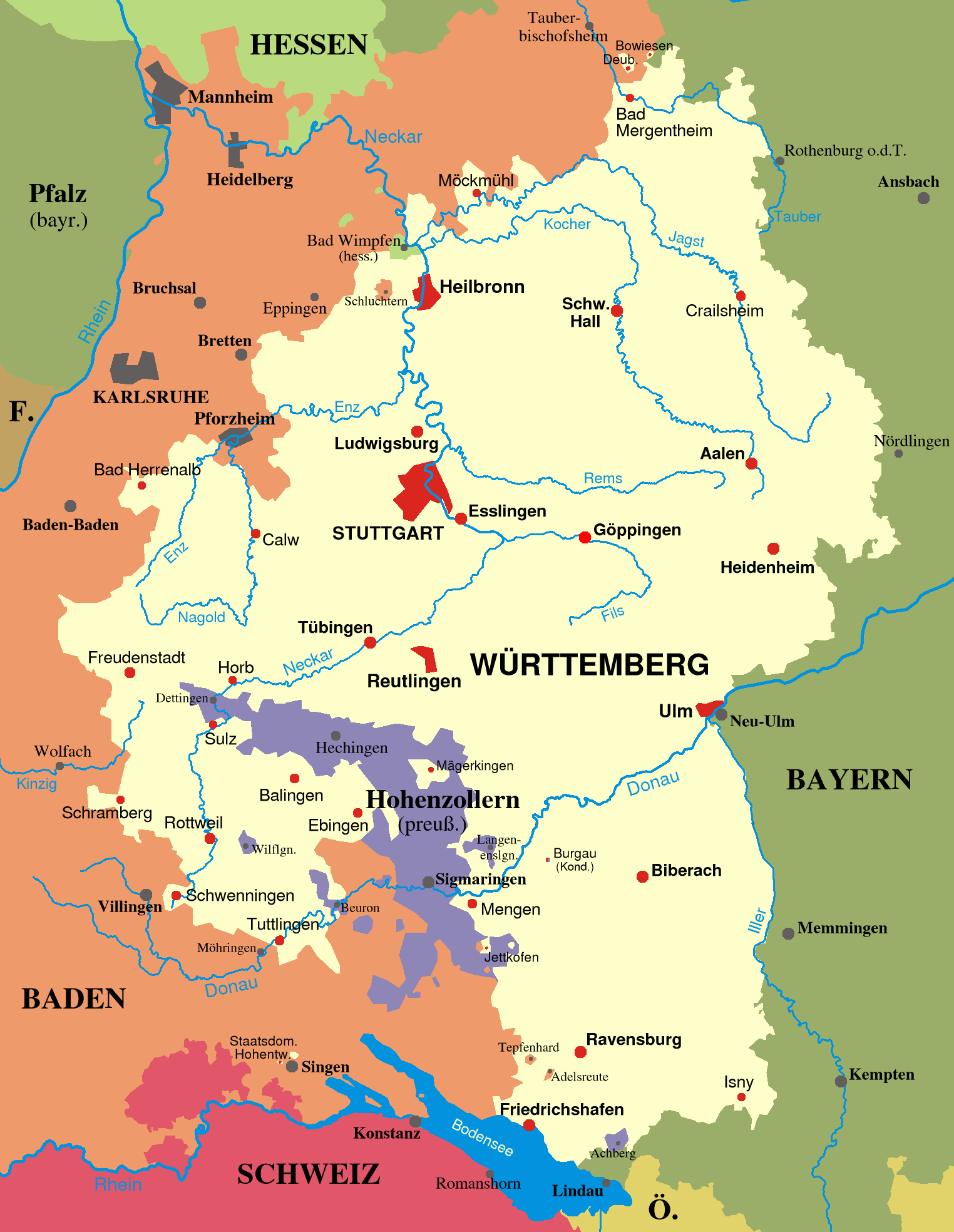
- Status: Member of the Confederation of the Rhine (1806–1813); Member of the German Confederation (1815–1866); Federal State of the German Empire (1871–1918)
- Capital: Stuttgart
- Common languages: Swabian German
- Religion: Lutheranism (state religion); Catholicism
- Demonym: Württemberger
- Government: Constitutional monarchy
- King
  - 1805–1816: Frederick I
  - 1816–1864: William I
  - 1864–1891: Charles I
  - 1891–1918: William II
- Minister-President
  - 1821–1831: Christian von Otto
  - 1918: Theodor Liesching
- Legislature: Landtag
  - Upper Chamber: Herrenhaus
  - Lower Chamber: Abgeordnetenhaus
- Historical era: Napoleonic Wars; World War I
  - Elevated to kingdom: 26 December 1806
  - German Revolution: 30 November 1918

Area
  - Total: 19.508 km^{2} (7.532 sq mi)
- 1813: 19,508 km^{2} (7,532 sq mi)

Population
  - 1812: 1,379,501
  - 1910: 2,437,574
- Currency: Württemberg gulden (1806–1873); German gold mark (1873–1914); German Papiermark (1914–1918)
Preceded by	Succeeded by
Electorate of Württemberg	Free People's State of Württemberg

The Kingdom of Württemberg (German: Königreich Württemberg [ˌkøːnɪkʁaɪç ˈvʏʁtəmbɛʁk]) was a German state that existed from 1806 to 1918, occupying territory in what is now the southern German federal state of Baden-Württemberg. The kingdom emerged during the period of territorial reorganisation that followed the dissolution of the Holy Roman Empire in 1806, when the Electorate of Württemberg was elevated to royal status as part of Napoleon’s restructuring of the German lands.

The Kingdom of Württemberg was the legal and political successor to the Electorate of Württemberg, which itself had been created in 1803 during the process of German mediatization (Reichsdeputationshauptschluss), when numerous ecclesiastical territories and free imperial cities were secularised and incorporated into larger territorial states. Duke Frederick II of Württemberg was raised to the dignity of Elector (Kurfürst) in 1803, substantially enlarging his territory through the annexation of former imperial cities and church lands.

In 1806, following the collapse of the Holy Roman Empire and the creation of the Confederation of the Rhine under French protection, Frederick assumed the title King Frederick I of Württemberg. The elevation formed part of Napoleon’s broader policy of strengthening allied German rulers in return for political and military support. Württemberg joined the Confederation of the Rhine and became a close ally of Napoleonic France, supplying troops for imperial campaigns and undertaking significant administrative reforms inspired by French models of governance.

During the nineteenth century, the kingdom developed into a medium-sized constitutional monarchy within the German Confederation and later the German Empire. Württemberg retained its own monarchy, constitution, and administrative institutions until the German Revolution of 1918 led to the abdication of King William II and the establishment of the Free People’s State of Württemberg (Freier Volksstaat Württemberg).

== Geography ==
The borders of the Kingdom of Württemberg, as defined in 1813, lay between 47°34' and 49°35' north and 8°15' and 10°30' east. The greatest distance north to south was 225 kilometres (140 mi) and the greatest east to west was 160 km (99 mi). The border had a total length of 1,800 km (1,100 mi) and the total area of the state was 19,508 km^{2} (7,532 sq mi).

The kingdom had borders with Bavaria on the east and south, with Baden in the north, west, and south. The southern part surrounded the Prussian province of Hohenzollern on most of its sides and touched on Lake Constance.

== History ==
Coat of arms of the Kingdom, 1806–1817

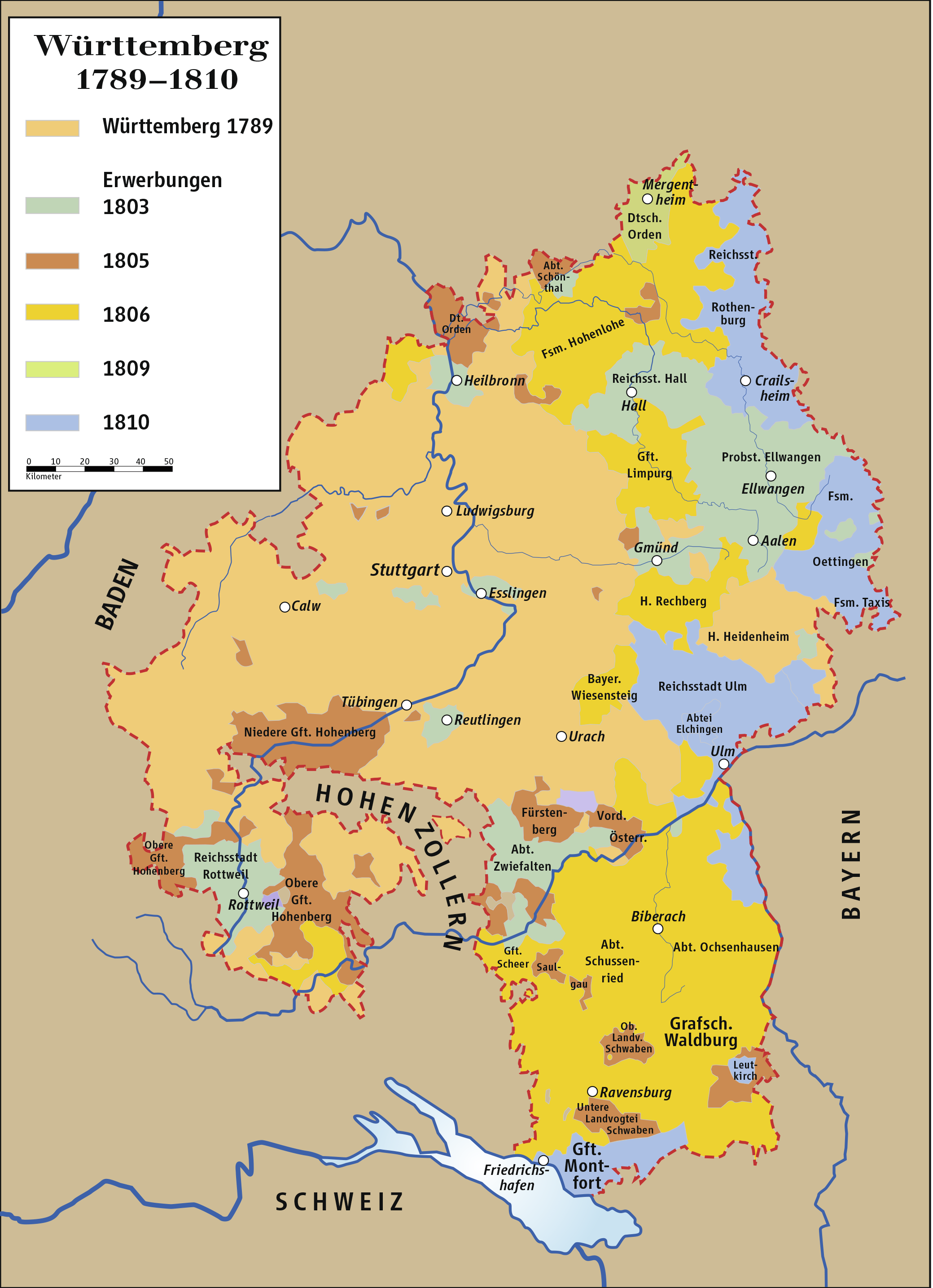
Kingdom of Württemberg in 1806–1810

=== Frederick I ===
Frederick III, the Duke of Württemberg (1754–1816; succeeded 1797) assumed the title of King Frederick I on 1 January 1806. He abrogated the constitution, and united Old and New Württemberg. Subsequently, he placed the property of the church under government control, and greatly extended the borders of the kingdom by the process of mediatisation.

In 1806, Frederick joined the Confederation of the Rhine and received further territory with 160,000 inhabitants. Later, by the Peace of Vienna of October 1809, about 110,000 more people came under his rule. In return for these favours, Frederick joined French Emperor Napoleon in his campaigns against Prussia, Austria, and Russia. Of the 16,000 of his subjects who marched to Moscow, only a few hundred returned. After the Battle of Leipzig in October 1813, Frederick deserted the French emperor and, by a treaty with Metternich at Fulda in November 1813, he secured the confirmation of his royal title and of his recent acquisitions of territory. Meanwhile, his troops marched into France with the allies. In 1815, the king joined the German Confederation, but the Congress of Vienna made no change to the extent of his lands. In the same year, he laid before the representatives of his people the outline of a new constitution, but they rejected it, and in the midst of the commotion that ensued, Frederick died on 30 October 1816.

=== William I ===
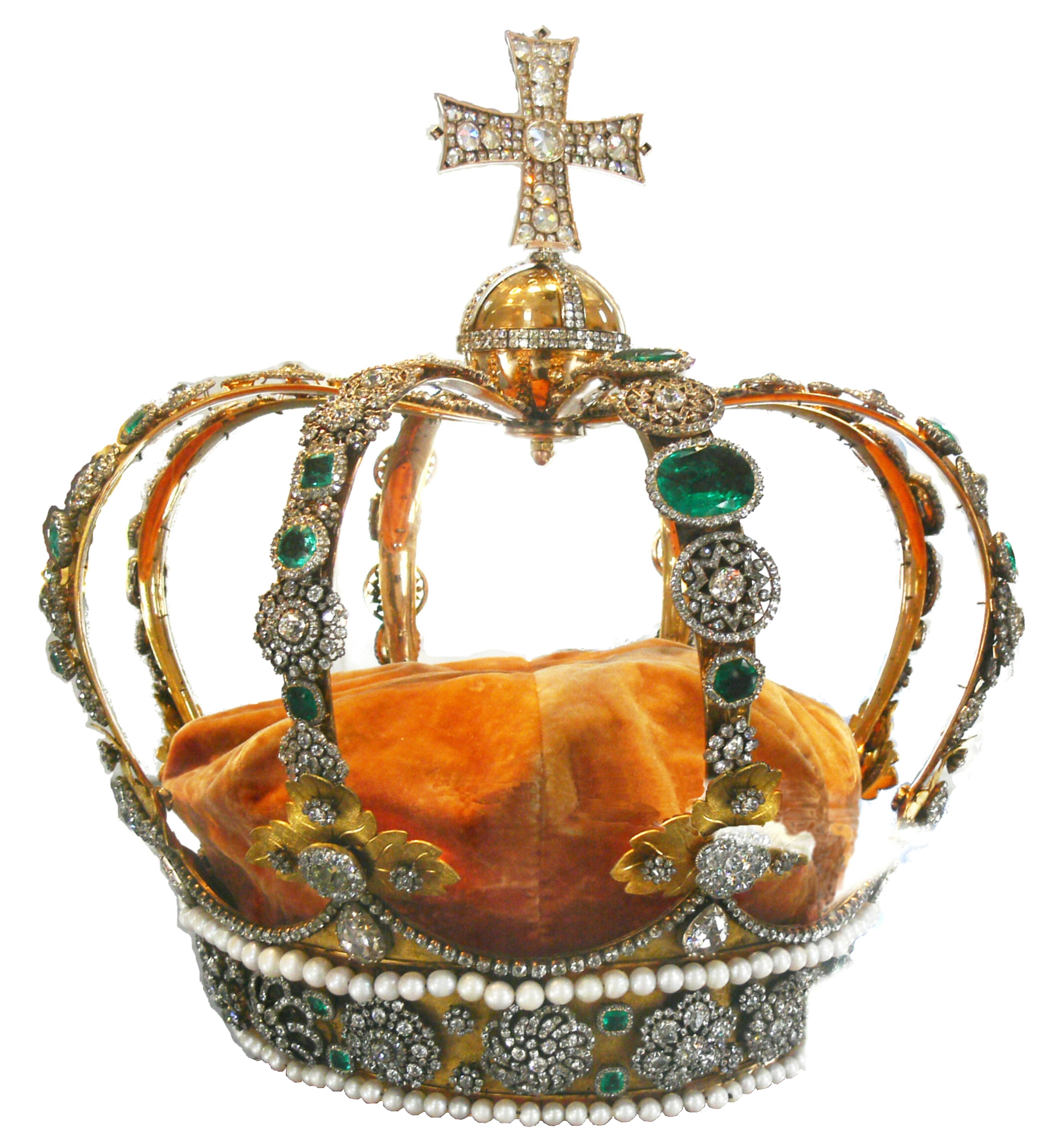
The Crown of Württemberg

Frederick was succeeded by his son, William I (1781–1864; succeeded 1816), who after much discussion, granted a new constitution in September 1819. This constitution (with subsequent modifications) remained in force until 1918. The desire for greater political freedom did not entirely fade under the constitution of 1819, and after 1830, some transitory unrest occurred.

A period of quiet set in and the condition of the kingdom, and its education, agriculture, trade, and economy improved. Both in public and in private matters, William's frugality helped to repair the country's shattered finances. The inclusion of Württemberg in the German Zollverein and the construction of railways fostered trade.

The revolutionary movement of 1848 did not leave Württemberg untouched, although no violence took place in the territory. William had to dismiss Johannes Schlayer (1792–1860) and his other ministers, and appoint men with more liberal ideas, proponents of a united Germany. William proclaimed a democratic constitution, but as soon as the movement had spent its force, he dismissed the liberal ministers, and in October 1849, Schlayer and his associates returned to power. In 1851, by interfering with popular electoral rights, the king and his ministers succeeded in assembling a servile diet that surrendered the privileges gained since 1848. In this way, the authorities restored the constitution of 1819 and power passed into bureaucratic hands. A concordat with the papacy proved almost the last act of William's long reign, but the diet repudiated the agreement.

=== Charles I ===
Map of the Kingdom of Württemberg and the Province of Hohenzollern in 1890

In July 1864, Charles I (1823–1891) succeeded his father William as king and almost at once had to face considerable difficulties. In the competition between Austria and Prussia for supremacy in Germany, William had consistently taken the Austrian side and the new king continued this policy. In 1866, Württemberg took up arms on behalf of Austria in the Austro-Prussian War, but three weeks after the Battle of Königgrätz (3 July 1866), the allies suffered a comprehensive defeat at the Battle of Tauberbischofsheim. The Prussians occupied northern Württemberg and negotiated a peace in August 1866. Württemberg paid an indemnity of 8,000,000 gulden, and concluded a secret offensive and defensive treaty with its conqueror. Württemberg was a party to the 1864 Geneva Convention and the St Petersburg Declaration of 1868.

The end of the struggle against Prussia allowed a renewal of democratic agitation in Württemberg, but this had achieved no tangible results when the war broke out in 1870. Although Württemberg had continued to be antagonistic to Prussia, the kingdom shared in the national enthusiasm that swept over Germany. The Army of Württemberg played a creditable part in the Battle of Wörth and in other operations of the war.

In 1871, Württemberg became a member of the new German Empire, but retained control of its own post office, telegraphs, and railways. It also had certain special privileges with regard to taxation and maintained its army autonomously within the Imperial German Army. For the next 10 years, Württemberg enthusiastically supported the new order. Many important reforms ensued, especially in the area of finance, but a proposal to unify the railway system with that of the rest of Germany failed. After reductions in taxation in 1889, changes to the constitution were considered. Charles wished to strengthen the conservative element in the chambers, but the laws of 1874, 1876, and 1879 effected only a slight amount of change.

=== William II ===
When King Charles died suddenly on 6 October 1891, he was succeeded by his nephew, William II (1848–1921), who continued Charles' policies. Constitutional discussions continued and the election of 1895 returned a powerful party of democrats. William had no sons, nor did his only Protestant kinsman, Duke Nicholas (1833–1903). Consequently, power was due to pass to a Roman Catholic branch of the family, raising difficulties concerning the relations between church and state. As of 1910, the heir to the throne was Duke Albert (born 1865) of the Altshausen family. An older Catholic line, that of the Duke of Urach, was bypassed as a result of a morganatic marriage contracted in 1800. A Protestant morganatic line included Mary of Teck, who married George V of the United Kingdom.

King William abdicated on 30 November 1918, following Germany's defeat in the First World War, ending a dynasty that had lasted 837 years. The kingdom was replaced with the Free People's State of Württemberg. After World War II, Württemberg was divided between the American and French occupation zones and became part of two new states: Württemberg-Baden and Württemberg-Hohenzollern. These two states merged with South Baden in 1952 to become the modern German state of Baden-Württemberg within the Federal Republic of Germany.

== Government ==
=== Constitution ===
The Kingdom of Württemberg functioned as a constitutional monarchy within the German Empire, with four votes in the Federal Council (German: Bundesrat) and 17 in the Imperial Diet (Reichstag). The constitution rested on a law of 1819, amended in 1868, 1874, and 1906. The king received a civil list (annual grant) equivalent to 103,227 pounds sterling in the early 20th century.

The kingdom possessed a centuries-old bicameral legislature known generally in English as the Estates of Württemberg. The upper chamber (German: Standesherren) comprised:

- Adult princes of the blood
- Heads of noble families from the rank of count (Graf) upwards
- Representatives of territories (Standesherrschaften) that possessed votes in the old German Imperial Diet or in the local diet
- Not more than six members nominated by the king
- Eight members of knightly rank
- Six ecclesiastical dignitaries
- One representative of the University of Tübingen
- One representative of the Stuttgart University of Technology
- Two representatives of commerce and industry
- Two representatives of agriculture
- One representative of handicrafts

The lower house (Abgeordnetenhaus) had 92 members:

- The 63 representatives from the administrative divisions (Oberamtsbezirke)
- Six representatives from Stuttgart, elected by proportional representation
- Six representatives, one from each of the six chief provincial towns
- Seventeen members from the two electoral divisions (Landeswahlkreise), elected by proportional representation

The king appointed the president of the upper chamber; after 1874, the lower chamber elected its own chairman. Members of each house had to be over 25 years of age. Württemberg parliamentary terms lasted six years and all male citizens over 25 had the right to vote in the ballots.

The highest executive power rested in the hands of the Ministry of State (Staatsministerium), consisting of six ministers: justice, foreign affairs (with the royal household, railways, posts and telegraphs), interior, public worship and education, war, and finance.

The kingdom also had a privy council, consisting of the ministers and some nominated councillors (wirkliche Staatsräte), who advised the sovereign. The judges of a special supreme court of justice, called the State Tribunal (Staatsgerichtshof) functioned as the guardians of the constitution. This court was partly elected by the chambers and partly appointed by the king. Each of the chambers had the right to impeach ministers.

The nation comprised four departments or districts (Kreise), subdivided into 64 divisions (Oberamtsbezirke), each under a "head man" (Oberamtmann) assisted by a local council (Amtsversammlung). Each department was headed by its own government (Regierung).

Between 1900 and 1910, the political history of Württemberg centred on constitutional and educational questions. The constitution was revised in 1906 when Württemberg introduced, before any other German state, the proportional system of election for the Second Chamber of the Diet. The result of the elections of 1906 was such that the two Liberal parties on the one side and the Catholic Centre and the Conservatives on the other were equally strong, so that the Social Democrats held the balance. Subsequent political changes resulted in a keen split between the parties, but the Prime Minister Karl von Weizsäcker stayed in office until the change in the constitution of the German Empire under Prince Maximilian of Baden's chancellorship in October 1918 compelled the Württemberg Government to give way, and the Weizsäcker Ministry resigned.

The kingdom ended with the abdication of William II in November, but the political system experienced no further convulsions of a serious character, with a constitution that resembled those of the other German states.

=== Religion ===
Authority over the churches resided with the king. So long as he belonged to the Evangelical State Church in Württemberg, the king was its guardian. The Protestant Church was controlled (under the Minister of Religion and Education) by a consistory and a synod. The consistory comprised a president, 9 councilors, and a general superintendent or prelate from each of six principal towns. The synod consisted of a representative council including both lay and clerical members.

The Catholic Church in the kingdom was led by the Bishop of Rottenburg-Stuttgart, who answered to the Archbishop of Freiburg im Breisgau. Politically, it obeyed a Catholic council that was appointed by the government.

A state-appointed council (Oberkirchenbehörde) regulated Judaism after 1828, forming the Israelite Religious Community of Württemberg (Israelitische Religionsgemeinschaft Württembergs).

=== Education ===
The kingdom claimed universal literacy (reading and writing) among citizens over the age of 10 years. Higher education institutions included the University of Tübingen, the Stuttgart University of Technology, the veterinary college, and the commercial college at Stuttgart, and the agricultural college of Hohenheim. Gymnasia and other schools existed in the larger towns, while every commune had a primary school. Numerous schools and colleges existed for women. Württemberg also had a school of viticulture. The education system was improved in 1909.

=== Army ===
Under the terms of a military convention of 25 November 1870, the troops of Württemberg formed the XIII (Royal Württemberg) Corps of the Imperial German Army.

=== Finances ===
Until 1873, the kingdom and some neighbouring states used the gulden. From 1857, the Vereinsthaler was introduced alongside it, and from 1873 onwards, both were replaced by the gold mark.

The state revenue for 1909–1910 totalled an estimated amount equivalent at the time to £4,840,520, nearly balanced by expenditure. About one-third of the revenue derived from railways, forests, and mines, about £1,400,000 from direct taxation, and the remainder from indirect taxes, the post office and sundry items. In 1909, the public debt amounted to £29,285,335, of which more than £27,000,000 resulted from railway construction.

Of the expenditure, over £900,000 went towards public worship and education, and over £1,200,000 went in interest and debt repayment. The kingdom contributed £660,000 to the treasury of the German Empire.

=== Population ===
Population statistics for Württemberg's four departments (Kreise) for 1900 and 1905 appear below:

District (Kreis)	Area		Population		Density	
District (Kreis)	(sq mi.)	(km^{2})	1900	1905	(pop./sq mi.) 1905	(pop./km^{2}) 1905
Neckarkreis (Neckar)	1,286	3,330	745,669	811,478	631	244
Schwarzwaldkreis (Black Forest)	1,844	4,780	509,258	541,662	293	113
Jagstkreis (Jagst)	1,985	5,140	400,126	407,059	205	79
Donaukreis (Danube)	2,419	6,270	514,427	541,980	224	87
Total	7,534	19,520	2,169,480	2,302,179	306	118

Settlement density was concentrated in the Neckar valley from Esslingen northward.

The overall rate of population increase from 1900 to 1905 amounted to 1.22% per year. About 8.5% of births were out of wedlock. Classified according to religion around 1905, about 69% of the population professed Protestantism, 30% Roman Catholicism, and about 0.5% Judaism. Protestants predominated in the Neckar district and Roman Catholics in the Danube district. The people of the north-west represent Alemannic stock, those of the north-east Franconian, and those of the centre and south Swabian.

=== Prominent civil servants ===
The Kingdom's civil service employed families and individuals who remained prominent in German public life after 1918. These included the Weizsäcker family, the von Neuraths and the von Stauffenbergs, and individuals such as Matthias Erzberger and Friedrich von Payer.

== Economy ==
In 1910, there were 506,061 people working in agriculture; 432,114 had industrial occupations; and 100,109 were in trade and commerce. The largest towns included Stuttgart (with Bad Cannstatt), Ulm, Heilbronn, Esslingen am Neckar, Reutlingen, Ludwigsburg, Göppingen, Schwäbisch Gmünd, Tübingen, Tuttlingen, and Ravensburg.

=== Agriculture ===
The territory of Württemberg was largely agricultural; of its 19,508 square kilometres (7,532 sq mi), 44.9% comprised agricultural land and gardens, 1.1% vineyards, 17.9% meadows and pastures, and 30.8% forests. It possessed rich meadowlands, cornfields, orchards, gardens, and hills covered with vines. The chief agricultural products were oats, spelt, rye, wheat, barley and hops, peas and beans, maize, fruit (chiefly cherries and apples), beets, and tobacco, as well as dairy and garden produce. Livestock included cattle, sheep, pigs, and horses.

Württemberg has a long history of producing red wines, growing different varieties from those grown in other German wine regions. The Württemberg wine region centred on the valley of the Neckar and several of its tributaries, the Rems, Enz, Kocher, and Jagst.

==== Swine ====
The Mohrenköpfle is the traditional swine. On the orders of King William I, masked pigs were imported from Central China in 1820/21, to improve pig breeding in the Kingdom of Württemberg. This crossbreeding with the "Chinese pigs" was particularly successful within the stocks of domestic pigs in the Hohenlohe region and the area around the town of Schwäbisch Hall.

==== Fruit trees ====
To help people to help themselves, Württemberg planted an alley of trees.(Dienstbarkeit on private ground). The tree farms of William I and the Brüdergemeinde delivered for free.

=== Mining ===
In former times, iron ore was mined on the Heuberg. The buttress wood was bought in Truchtelfingen and used by Lautlingen miners at the Hörnle area. In Oberdigisheim Geppert in 1738 SHW-Ludwigsthal produced iron ore. From an old 3.5 km mine in an ooidal iron ore seam (Doggererzflöz) in Weilheim is wood in the Tuttlinger Fruchtkasten. Steel was produced in Tuttlingen by the Schwäbische Hüttenwerke in Ludwigstal, which produces now iron brakes. had a factory. Ooidal iron ore (Bohnerz aus Eisenroggenstein) was found. After the Franco-Prussian War, the mining was stopped. The main minerals of industrial importance found in the kingdom were salt and iron. The salt industry came to prominence at the beginning of the 19th century. The iron industry had greater antiquity, but the lack of coal slowed its development. Other minerals included granite, limestone, ironstone, and fireclay.

=== Manufacturing ===
Textile manufacturers produced linen, woolen, and cotton fabrics, particularly at Esslingen and Göppingen, and paper making was prominent in Ravensburg, Heilbronn, and throughout Lower Swabia.

Assisted by the government, manufacturing industries developed rapidly during the later years of the 19th century, notably metal working, especially branches that required skilled workmanship. Particular importance attached to iron and steel goods, locomotives (for which Esslingen enjoyed a good reputation), machinery, cars, bicycles, small arms (in the Mauser factory at Oberndorf am Neckar), scientific and artistic appliances, pianos (at Stuttgart), organs and other musical instruments, photographic apparatus, clocks (in the Black Forest), electrical apparatus, and gold and silver goods. Chemical works, potteries, cabinet-making workshops, sugar factories, breweries, and distilleries operated throughout the kingdom. Hydropower and petrol largely compensated for the lack of coal, and liquid carbonic acid was produced from natural gas springs beside the Eyach, a tributary of the Neckar.

=== Commerce ===
The kingdom's principal exports included cattle, cereals, wood, pianos, salt, oil, leather, cotton and linen fabrics, beer, wine, and spirits. Commerce centred on the cities of Stuttgart, Ulm, Heilbronn, and Friedrichshafen. Stuttgart boasted an extensive book trade. The kingdom had creative inventors; Gottlieb Daimler, the first car manufacturer, incorporated his business in 1900 as Daimler Motoren Gesellschaft, and its successor company Mercedes-Benz always had plants near Stuttgart. At Friedrichshafen on Lake Constance, Count Ferdinand von Zeppelin constructed airships from 1897 until his death in 1917.

=== Transport ===
In 1907, the kingdom had 2,000 km (1,200 mi) of railways, of which all except 256 km (159 mi) belonged to the state. Navigable waterways included the Neckar, the Schussen, Lake Constance, and the Danube downstream from Ulm. The kingdom had fairly good quality roads, the oldest of them of Roman construction. Württemberg, like Bavaria, retained the control of its own postal and telegraph service following the foundation of the new German Empire in 1871. In 1904, the Württemberg railway system integrated with that of the rest of Germany.
