= W =

Twenty-third letter of the Latin alphabet

- W w

Usage
- Writing system: Latin script
- Type: Alphabetic and logographic
- Sound values: [w]; [v]; [β]; [u]; [uː]; [ʊ]; [ɔ]; [ʋ]; [ʕʷ]; [ʙ]; [◌ʷ]; [ɣ]; [f]
- In Unicode: U+0057, U+0077
- Alphabetical position: 23

History
Development
G43T3
        - Υ υ
          - 𐌖
            - V
              - W w
- Time period: c. 600 CE to present
- Descendants: • ʍ; • ɯ ɰ; • ₩
- Sisters: F; Y; U; Ѵ; У; Ў; Ұ; Ү; ו; و; ܘ; וּ; וֹ; ࠅ; 𐎆; 𐡅; ወ; વ; ૂ ુ; उ

Other
- Associated graphs: w(x)
- Writing direction: Left-to-right

W (minuscule: w) is the twenty-third letter of the Latin alphabet, used in the modern English alphabet, the alphabets of other western European languages and others worldwide. Its name in English is double-u, (Note: Pronounced /ˈdʌbəl.juː/ DUH-bəl-yoo in formal situations, but colloquially often /ˈdʌbəjuː/ DUH-bə-yoo, /ˈdʌbjuː/ DUH-bew, /ˈdʌbəjə/ DUH-bə-yə or /ˈdʌbjə/ DUH-byə, with a silent l.) plural double-ues.

== Name ==
The name "double-u" reflects stages in the letter's evolution when it was considered two of the same letter, a double U.

It is colloquially shortened to "dub-u", which may also be shortened to "dub"; for example, University of Wisconsin, University of Washington, University of Wyoming, University of Waterloo, University of the Western Cape and University of Western Australia are all known colloquially as "U Dub", The automobile company Volkswagen, abbreviated "VW", is sometimes pronounced "V-Dub".

In other West Germanic languages, its name is monosyllabic: German We /veː/ (vs. Vau /fa͜ʊ/ for v), Dutch wee /ʋeː/ (vs. vee /veː/ for v). In Polish it is called wu /vu/ (vs. fał /faw/ or we /vɛ/ for v). In many languages, its name literally means "double v": Portuguese duplo vê, (Note: In Brazilian Portuguese, it is dáblio, which is a loanword from the English double-u.) Spanish doble ve (though it can be spelled uve doble), (Note: In Latin American Spanish, it is doble ve, similar regional variations exist in other Spanish-speaking countries.) French double vé, Icelandic tvöfalt vaff, Czech dvojité vé, Estonian kaksisvee, Finnish kaksois-vee, etc.

== History ==
Proto-Sinaitic	Phoenician Waw	Western Greek Upsilon	Latin V	Latin W
			Latin V	Latin W

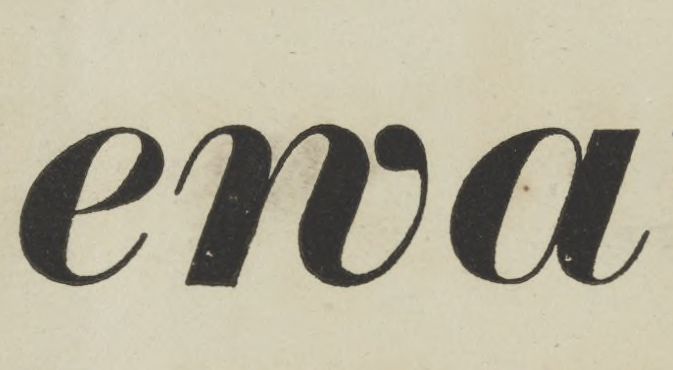
This 'w' was popular in italic script; from a typeface c. 1816.

The classical Latin alphabet, from which the modern European alphabets derived, did not have the "W" character. The "W" sounds were represented by the Latin letter "V" (at the time, not yet distinct from "U").

The sounds /w/ (spelled ⟨V⟩) and /b/ (spelled ⟨B⟩) of Classical Latin developed into the voiced bilabial fricative /β/ between vowels in Early Medieval Latin. Therefore, ⟨V⟩ no longer adequately represented the voiced labial-velar approximant sound /w/ of Germanic phonology.

A letter W appearing in the coat of arms of Vyborg

The Germanic /w/ phoneme was therefore written as ⟨VV⟩ or ⟨uu⟩ by the earliest writers of Old English and Old High German in the 7th or 8th centuries; ⟨u⟩ and ⟨v⟩ became distinct only by the Early Modern period. Gothic (not Latin-based), by contrast, had simply used a letter based on the Greek Υ for the same sound in the 4th century. The digraph ⟨VV⟩/⟨uu⟩ was also used in Medieval Latin to represent Germanic names, including Gothic ones like Wamba.

It is from this ⟨uu⟩ digraph that the modern name "double U" derives. The digraph was commonly used in the spelling of Old High German but only in the earliest texts in Old English, where the /w/ sound soon came to be represented by borrowing the rune ⟨ᚹ⟩, adapted as the Latin letter wynn: ⟨ƿ⟩. In early Middle English, following the 11th-century Norman Conquest, ⟨uu⟩ regained popularity; by 1300, it had taken wynn's place in common use.

Scribal realisation of the digraph could look like a pair of Vs whose branches crossed in the middle: both forms (separate and crossed) appear, for instance, in the "running text" (in Latin) of the Bayeux Tapestry in proper names such as EDVVARDVS and VVILLELMVS (or the same with crossed Vs). Another realisation (common in italic, roundhand, kurrent, blackletter, and other scripts) takes a form like an ⟨n⟩ whose rightmost branch curved around, as in a ⟨v⟩ (viz. $\mathfrak{w}.$) (Note: Writing manuals that include it include Edward Cocker's The Pen's Triumph of 1658 and engravings of the roundhand calligraphy of Charles Snell and sometimes George Bickham. See also Florian Hardwig's gallery Archived May 18, 2020, at the Wayback Machine of images of its use in the German-speaking countries.)

Thus, the shift from the digraph ⟨VV⟩ to the distinct ligature ⟨W⟩ was gradual and was only apparent in abecedaria, explicit listings of all individual letters. It was probably considered a separate letter by the 14th century in both Middle English and Middle German orthography. However, it remained an outsider, not really considered part of the Latin alphabet proper, as expressed by Valentin Ickelshamer in the 16th century, who complained that:

Poor w is so infamous and unknown that many barely know either its name or its shape, not those who aspire to being Latinists, as they have no need of it, nor do the Germans, not even the schoolmasters, know what to do with it or how to call it; some call it we, [... others] call it uu, [...] the Swabians call it auwawau

In Middle High German (and possibly already in late Old High German), the West Germanic phoneme /w/ became realized as [v]; this is why, today, the German ⟨w⟩ represents that sound.

== Use in writing systems ==
Pronunciation of ⟨w⟩ by language
Orthography	Phonemes
Standard Chinese (Pinyin)	/w/
Cornish	/ʊ/ (archaic), /w/
Dutch	/ʋ/
English	/w/
German	/v/
Irish	/w/
Indonesian	/w/
Japanese (Hepburn)	/w/
Kashubian	/v/
Kokborok	/ɔ/
Kurdish	/w/
Low German	/ʋ/
Lower Sorbian	/v/
North Frisian	/v/
Old Prussian	/w/ (archaic)
Polish	/v/
Saterlandic	/v/
Turkmen	/β/
Upper Sorbian	/β/
Walloon	/w/
Welsh	/ʊ/, /w/
West Frisian	/v/, /w/
Wymysorys	/v/
Zhuang	/ɯ/

=== English ===
English uses ⟨w⟩ to represent /w/. There are also a number of words beginning with a written ⟨w⟩ that are silent in most dialects before a (pronounced) ⟨r⟩, remaining from usage in Old English in which the ⟨w⟩ was pronounced: wreak, wrap, wreck, wrench, wroth, wrinkle, etc. Certain dialects of Scottish English still distinguish this digraph. ⟨w⟩ represents a vowel sound, /oʊ/, in the word pwn, and in the Welsh loanwords cwm and crwth, it retains the Welsh pronunciation, /ʊ/. ⟨w⟩ is also used in digraphs: ⟨aw⟩ /ɔː/, ⟨ew⟩ /(j)uː/, ⟨ow⟩ /aʊ, oʊ/, wherein it is usually an orthographic allograph of ⟨u⟩ in final positions. It is the fifteenth most frequently used letter in the English language, with a frequency of about 2.56% in words.

=== Other languages ===
In Europe languages with ⟨w⟩ in native words are in a central-western European zone between Cornwall and Poland: English, German, Low German, Dutch, Frisian, Welsh, Cornish, Breton, Walloon, Polish, Kashubian, Sorbian, Wymysorys, Resian and Scandinavian dialects. German, Polish, Wymysorys and Kashubian use it for the voiced labiodental fricative /v/ (with Polish, related Kashubian and Wymysorys using Ł for /w/, except in conservative and some eastern Polish speech, where Ł still represents the dark L sound.), and Dutch uses it for /ʋ/. Unlike its use in other languages, the letter is used in Welsh and Cornish to represent the vowel /u/ as well as the related approximant consonant /w/.

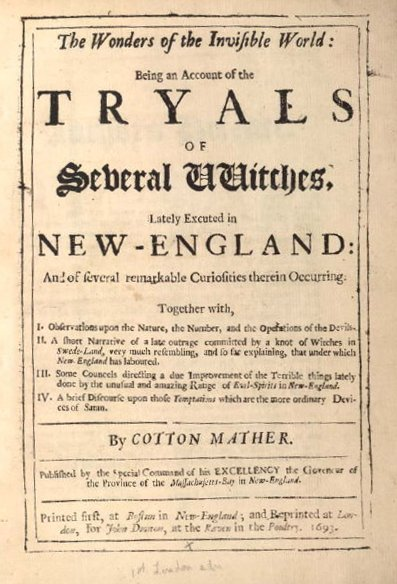
A 1693 book printing that uses the "double u" alongside the modern letter; this was acceptable if printers did not have the letter in stock or the font had been made without it.

The following languages historically used ⟨w⟩ for /v/ in native words, but later replaced it by ⟨v⟩: Swedish, Finnish, Czech, Slovak, Latvian, Lithuanian, Estonian, Ukrainian Łatynka and Belarusian Łacinka. It is also used in modern systems of Romanization of Belarusian for the letter ⟨ў⟩, for example in the BGN/PCGN system, in contrast to the letter ⟨ŭ⟩, which is used in the Instruction on transliteration of Belarusian geographical names with letters of Latin script.

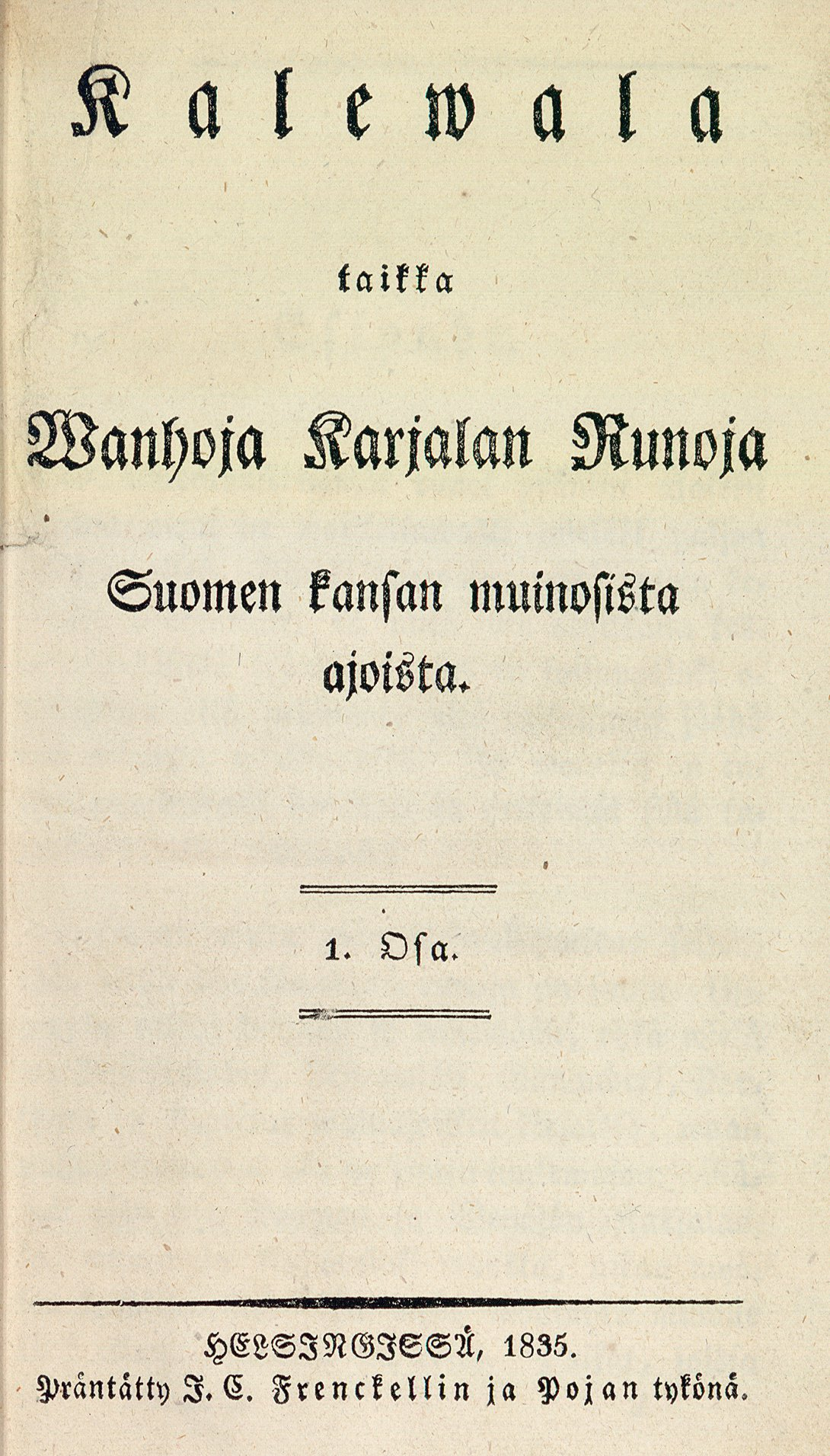
Titlepage of the first edition of the Kalevala, 1835

In Swedish and Finnish, traces of this old usage may still be found in proper names. In Hungarian remains in some aristocratic surnames, e.g. Wesselényi.

Modern German dialects generally have only [v] or [ʋ] for West Germanic /w/, but [w] or [β̞] is still heard allophonically for ⟨w⟩, especially in the clusters ⟨schw⟩, ⟨zw⟩, and ⟨qu⟩. Some Bavarian dialects preserve a "light" initial [w], such as in wuoz (Standard German weiß [vaɪs] '[I] know'). The Classical Latin [β] is heard in the Southern German greeting Servus ('hello' or 'goodbye').

In Dutch, ⟨w⟩ became a labiodental approximant /ʋ/ (with the exception of words with -⟨eeuw⟩, which have /eːβ/, or other diphthongs containing -⟨uw⟩). In many Dutch-speaking areas, such as Flanders and Suriname, the /β/ pronunciation (or in some areas a /ɥ/ pronunciation, e.g. Belgian-Dutch water /'ɥaːtər/ "water", wit /ɥɪt/ "white", eeuw /eːɥ/ "century", etc.) is used at all times.

In Finnish, ⟨w⟩ is sometimes seen as a variant of ⟨v⟩ and not a separate letter, but it is a part of the official alphabet. It is, however, recognized and maintained in the spelling of some old names, reflecting an earlier German spelling standard, and in some modern loan words. In all cases, it is pronounced /ʋ/. The title of the first edition of the Kalevala was spelled Kalewala.

In Danish, Norwegian and Swedish, ⟨w⟩ is named double-v and not double-u. In these languages, the letter only exists in old names, loanwords and foreign words. (Foreign words are distinguished from loanwords by having a significantly lower level of integration in the language.) It is usually pronounced /v/, but in some words of English origin, it may be pronounced /w/. The letter was officially introduced in the Danish and Swedish alphabets as late as 1980 and 2006, respectively, despite having been in use for much longer. It had been recognized since the conception of modern Norwegian with the earliest official orthography rules of 1907. ⟨W⟩ was earlier seen as a variant of ⟨v⟩, and ⟨w⟩ as a letter (double-v) is still commonly replaced by ⟨v⟩ in speech (e.g. WC being pronounced as VC, www as VVV, WHO as VHO, etc.). The two letters were sorted as equals before ⟨w⟩ was officially recognized, and that practice is still recommended when sorting names in Sweden. In modern slang, some native speakers may pronounce ⟨w⟩ more closely to the origin of the loanword than the official /v/ pronunciation.

Multiple dialects of Swedish and Danish use the sound, however. In Denmark, notably in Jutland, the northern half uses it extensively in traditional dialect, and in multiple places in Sweden. It is used in southern Swedish; for example, the words "wesp" (wisp) and "wann" (water) are traditionally used in Halland. In northern and western Sweden, there are also dialects with /w/. Elfdalian is a good example, which is one of many dialects where the Old Norse difference between v (/w/) and f (/v/ or /f/) is preserved. Thus, "warg" from Old Norse "vargr", but "åvå" from Old Norse "hafa".

In the alphabets of most modern Romance languages, ⟨w⟩ is used mostly in foreign names and words recently borrowed (Italian il watt, Spanish el kiwi). In Spanish, Italian, and Portuguese, [w] is a non-syllabic variant of /u/, spelled ⟨u⟩. In French, ⟨w⟩ is also used mostly in foreign names and words recently borrowed such as wagon or week(-)end, but in the first case it is pronounced [v] (because of its German origin; except in Belgium, where it is pronounced [w]) and in the second [w]. In most northern French dialects, the former ⟨w⟩ turned finally to ⟨v⟩, but still exists as a remnant in the place-names of Romance Flanders, Picardie, Artois, Champagne, Romance Lorraine and sometimes elsewhere (Normandy, Île-de-France), and in the surnames from the same regions. Walloon as it sounds conserves the ⟨w⟩ pronounced [w]. The digraph ⟨ou⟩ is used to render ⟨w⟩ in rare French words such as ouest "west" and to spell Arabic names transliterated -wi in English, but -oui in French (compare Arabic surname Badawi / Badaoui). In all these languages, as in Scandinavian languages mentioned above, the letter is named "double v" (French /dubləve/, Spanish /'dɔble 'uβe/) though in Belgium the name /we/ is also used.

In Indonesian, the letter "w" is called wé. The letter names in Indonesian are always the same with the sounds they produce, especially the consonants.

The Japanese language uses "W", pronounced daburu, as an ideogram meaning "double". It is also used in internet slang to indicate laughter (like LOL), derived from the word warau (笑う, meaning "to laugh").

In Italian, while the letter ⟨w⟩ is not considered part of the standard Italian alphabet, the character is often used in place of Viva ("hooray for..."), generally in the form in which the branches of the Vs cross in the middle, at least in handwriting (in fact, it could be considered a monogram). The same symbol written upside down indicates abbasso ("down with...").

In the Kokborok language, ⟨w⟩ represents the open-mid back rounded vowel /ɔ/.

In Turkey, the use of the ⟨w⟩ was banned between 1928 and 2013 which was a problem for the Kurdish population in Turkey as the ⟨w⟩ was a letter of the Kurdish alphabet. The use of the letter ⟨w⟩ in the word Newroz, the Kurdish new year, was forbidden, and names which included the letter were not able to be used. In 2008, a court in Gaziantep reasoned the use of the letter ⟨w⟩ would incite civil unrest.

In Vietnamese, ⟨w⟩ is called vê đúp or vê kép (lit. 'double V'), from the French double vé. It is not included in the standard Vietnamese alphabet, but it is often used as a substitute for qu- in literary dialect and very informal writing. It's also commonly used for abbreviating Ư in formal documents, for example Trung Ương is abbreviated as TW even in official documents and document ID number, derived from the Vietnamese Telex input method that usually interpret a single "w" into Vietnamese character "ư".

"W" is the 24th letter in the Modern Filipino Alphabet and has its English name. However, in the old Filipino alphabet, Abakada, it was the 19th letter and had the name "wah".

In Washo, lower-case ⟨w⟩ represents a typical /w/ sound, while upper-case ⟨W⟩ represents a voiceless w sound, like the difference between English weather and whether for those who maintain the distinction.

=== Other systems ===
In the International Phonetic Alphabet, ⟨w⟩ is used for the voiced labial-velar approximant.

== Other uses ==
- W is the symbol for the chemical element tungsten, after its German (and alternative English) name, Wolfram.
- W is the SI symbol for the watt, the standard unit of power.
- w is also often used as a variable in mathematics, especially to represent a complex number or a vector.
- Former U.S. president George W. Bush was given the nickname "Dubya" after the colloquial pronunciation of his middle initial in Texas, where he spent much of his childhood.
- W stands for work in physics.

== Related characters ==
=== Ancestors, descendants and siblings ===
- 𐤅: Semitic letter Waw, from which the following symbols originally derive:
- U: Latin letter U
- V: Latin letter V
- Ⱳ ⱳ: W with hook
- Ꝡ ꝡ: Ligature for the Latin letters VY
- Ꟃ ꟃ: Anglicana W, used in medieval English and Cornish
- IPA-specific symbols related to W: ʍ ɯ ɰ ʷ
- Uralic Phonetic Alphabet-specific symbols related to W: U+1D21 ᴡ LATIN LETTER SMALL CAPITAL W and U+1D42 ᵂ MODIFIER LETTER CAPITAL W
- ʷ : Modifier letter small w is used in Indo-European studies
- ꭩ : Modifier letter small turned w is used in linguistic transcriptions of Scots
- W with diacritics: Ẃ ẃ Ẁ ẁ Ŵ ŵ Ẅ ẅ Ẇ ẇ Ẉ ẉ ẘ
- װ (double vav): the Yiddish and Hebrew equivalent of W
- Arabic و, has the same origin despite bearing little resemblance to W

=== Ligatures and abbreviations ===
- ₩ : Won sign, capital letter W with double stroke

== Other representations ==
=== Unicode ===
- U+0057 W LATIN CAPITAL LETTER W
- U+0077 w LATIN SMALL LETTER W
- U+FF37 Ｗ FULLWIDTH LATIN CAPITAL LETTER W
- U+FF57 ｗ FULLWIDTH LATIN SMALL LETTER W
- U+20A9 ₩ WON SIGN

=== Other ===
NATO phonetic	Morse code
Whiskey	▄ ▄▄▄ ▄▄▄

Signal flag

Flag semaphore
American manual alphabet (ASL fingerspelling)
British manual alphabet (BSL fingerspelling)
Braille dots-2456
Unified English Braille

== See also ==
- Digamma (Ϝ), the archaic Greek letter for /w/
- Voiced labio-velar approximant
- Wh
