= Round hand =

Type of handwriting

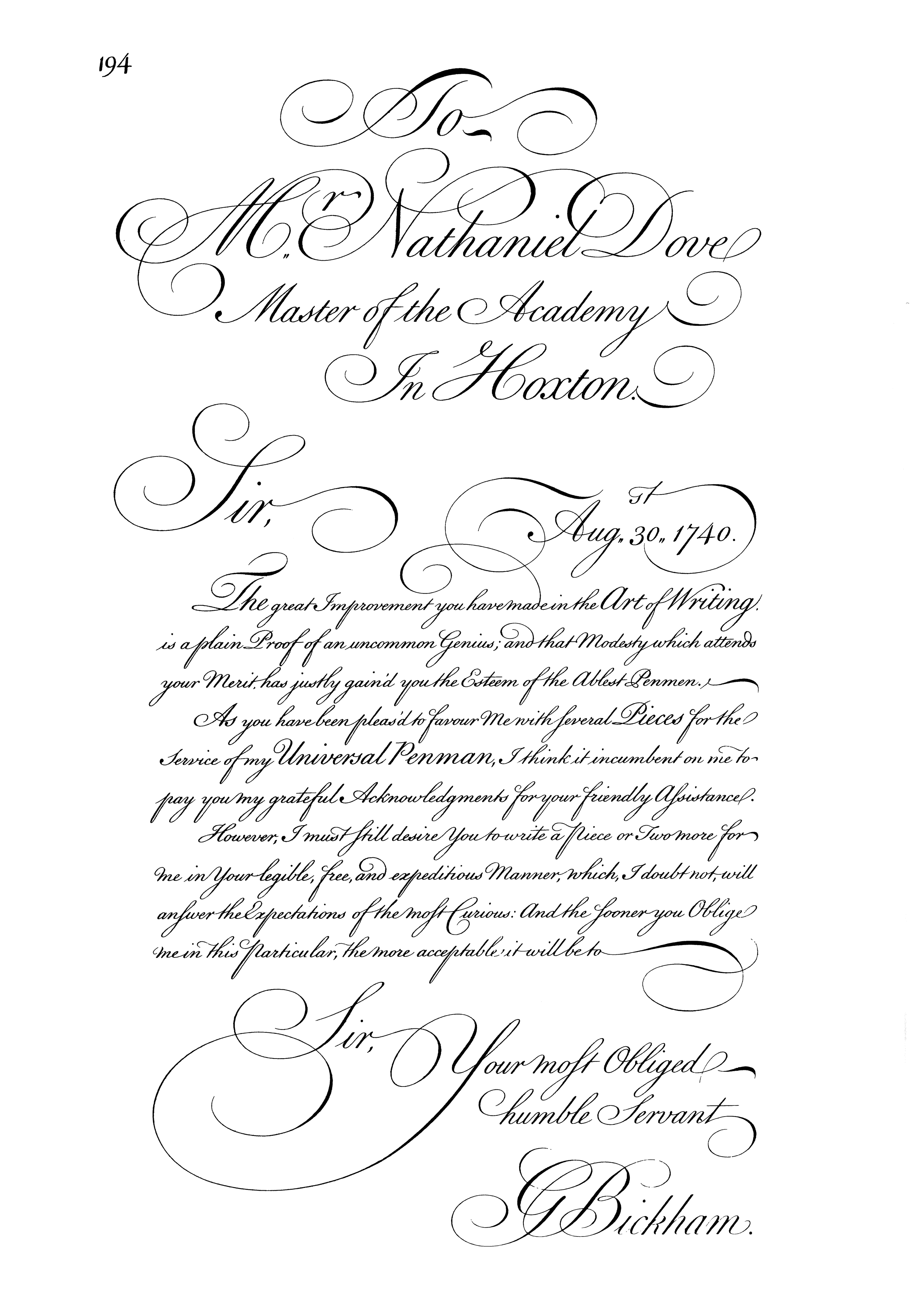
George Bickham's round hand script, from The Universal Penman, c. 1740–1741

Round hand (also roundhand) is a type of handwriting and calligraphy originating in England in the 1660s primarily by the writing masters John Ayres and William Banson. It is characterised by its round oval letterforms, open flowing style, and contrast of thick and thin strokes. Its popularity of round hand grew rapidly, becoming codified as a standard, through the publication of printed writing manuals.

The typefaces Snell Roundhand and Kuenstler Script are based on this style of handwriting. Charles Snell was particularly noted for his reaction to other variants of round hand, developing his own Snell Roundhand, which emphasised restraint and proportionality in the script.

== Origins ==
During the Renaissance, writing masters of the Apostolic Camera developed the italic cursiva script. When the Apostolic Camera was destroyed during the sack of Rome in 1527, many masters moved to Southern France where they began to refine the renaissance italic cursiva script into a new script, italic circumflessa. By the end of the 16th century, italic circumflessa began to replace italic cursiva.

In England, writing master and mathematician Edward Cocker had been publishing copybooks based upon Italian hand in the 1640s. In the 1680s, John Ayres and William Banson popularized their versions of roundhand after further refining and developing it into what had become known as English round hand style.

== Golden age ==
Later in the 17th and 18th centuries, English writing masters including George Bickham, George Shelley and Charles Snell helped to propagate round hand's popularity, so that by the mid-18th century the round hand style had spread across Europe and crossed the Atlantic to North America. These scripts would evolve into copperplate script.

== See also ==
- Bastarda
- Calligraphy
- Cursive
- Italic script
- Ronde script
