= U (Indic) =

Letter "U" in Indic scripts

Example glyphs
- Bengali–Assamese: উ
- Tibetan: ཨུ
- Tamil: உ
- Malayalam: ഉ
- Sinhala: උ
- Ashoka Brahmi: U
- Devanagari: उ

Cognates
- Hebrew: ו
- Greek: Ϝ (Ϛ), Υ (Ȣ)
- Latin: F, V, U, W, Y, Ⅎ
- Cyrillic: Ѕ, У (Ꙋ), Ѵ, Ю

Properties
- Phonemic representation: /u/ /ʊ/
- IAST transliteration: u U
- ISCII code point: A8 (168)

U is a vowel of Indic abugidas. In modern Indic scripts, U is derived from the early "Ashoka" Brahmi letter after having gone through the Gupta letter. As an Indic vowel, U comes in two normally distinct forms: 1) as an independent letter, and 2) as a vowel sign for modifying a base consonant. Bare consonants without a modifying vowel sign have the inherent "A" vowel.

== Āryabhaṭa numeration ==
Aryabhata used Devanagari letters for numbers, very similar to the Greek numerals, even after the invention of Indian numerals. The उ sign ु was used to modify a consonant's value ×10^{4}, but the vowel letter did not have an inherent value by itself.

== Historic U ==
There are three different general early historic scripts - Brahmi and its variants, Kharoṣṭhī, and Tocharian, the so-called slanting Brahmi. U as found in standard Brahmi, was a simple geometric shape, with variations toward more flowing forms by the Gupta. Like all Brahmic scripts, Tocharian U has an accompanying vowel mark for modifying a base consonant. In Kharoṣṭhī, the only independent vowel letter is for the inherent A. All other independent vowels, including U are indicated with vowel marks added to the letter A.

=== Brahmi U ===
The Brahmi letter U, is probably derived from the altered Aramaic Waw, and is thus related to the modern Latin F, V, U, W, Y and Greek Upsilon. Several identifiable styles of writing the Brahmi U can be found, most associated with a specific set of inscriptions from an artifact or diverse records from an historic period. As the earliest and most geometric style of Brahmi, the letters found on the Edicts of Ashoka and other records from around that time are normally the reference form for Brahmi letters, with vowel marks not attested until later forms of Brahmi back-formed to match the geometric writing style.

Brahmi U historic forms
Ashoka (3rd-1st c. BCE)	Girnar (~150 BCE)	Kushana (~150-250 CE)	Gujarat (~250 CE)	Gupta (~350 CE)

=== Tocharian U ===
The Tocharian letter is derived from the Brahmi. Unlike some of the consonants, Tocharian vowels do not have a Fremdzeichen form.

Tocharian consonants with U vowel marks
Ku	Khu	Gu	Ghu	Cu	Chu	Ju	Jhu	Nyu	Ṭu	Ṭhu	Ḍu	Ḍhu	Ṇu
Tu	Thu	Du	Dhu	Nu	Pu	Phu	Bu	Bhu	Mu	Yu	Ru	Lu	Vu
Śu	Ṣu	Su	Hu										

=== Kharoṣṭhī U ===
The Kharoṣṭhī letter U is indicated with the vowel mark. As an independent vowel, U is indicated by adding the vowel marks to the independent vowel letter A.

== Devanagari U ==
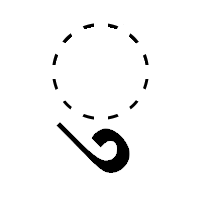
Devanagari independent U and U vowel sign.

U (उ) is a vowel of the Devanagari abugida. It ultimately arose from the Brahmi letter, after having gone through the Gupta letter. Letters that derive from it are the Gujarati letter ઉ, and the Modi letter 𑘄.

=== Devanagari-using languages ===
The Devanagari script is used to write the Hindi language, Sanskrit and the majority of Indo-Aryan languages. In most of these languages, उ is pronounced as [u]. Like all Indic scripts, Devanagari vowels come in two forms: an independent vowel form for syllables that begin with a vowel sound, and a vowel sign attached to base consonant to override the inherent /ə/ vowel.

== Bengali U ==
Bengali independent U and U vowel sign.

U (উ) is a vowel of the Bengali abugida. It is derived from the Siddhaṃ letter, and is marked by a similar horizontal head line, but less geometric shape, than its Devanagari counterpart, उ.

=== Bengali script-using languages ===
The Bengali script is used to write several languages of eastern India, notably the Bengali language and Assamese. In most languages, উ is pronounced as [u]. Like all Indic scripts, Bengali vowels come in two forms: an independent vowel form for syllables that begin with a vowel sound, and a vowel sign attached to base consonant to override the inherent /ɔ/ vowel.

== Gujarati U ==
Gujarati independent U and U vowel sign.

U (ઉ) is a vowel of the Gujarati abugida. It is derived from the Devanagari U, and ultimately the Brahmi letter.

=== Gujarati-using languages ===
The Gujarati script is used to write the Gujarati and Kutchi languages. In both languages, ઉ is pronounced as [u]. Like all Indic scripts, Gujarati vowels come in two forms: an independent vowel form for syllables that begin with a vowel sound, and a vowel sign attached to base consonant to override the inherent /ə/ vowel. In addition to the standard vowel sign, U forms a unique ligature when combined with the consonant R:

- ર (r) + ઉ (u) gives the ligature ru:

== Telugu U ==
Telugu independent vowel and vowel sign U.

U (ఉ) is a vowel of the Telugu abugida. It ultimately arose from the Brahmi letter. It is closely related to the Kannada letter ಉ. Like in other Indic scripts, Telugu vowels have two forms: and independent letter for word and syllable-initial vowel sounds, and a vowel sign for changing the inherent "a" of Telugu consonant letters. Vowel signs in Telugu can interact with a base consonant in one of three ways: 1) the vowel sign touches or sits adjacent to the base consonant without modifying the shape of either 2) the vowel sign sits directly above the consonant, replacing its v-shaped headline, 3) the vowel sign and consonant interact, forming a ligature.

Telugu U vowel sign on క, ఖ, గ, ఘ & ఙ: Ku, Khu, Gu, Ghu and Ngu. As a right-side attaching vowel mark, it does not alter the shape of the underlying consonant, although there are variants of the vowel mark that attach in different ways.

== Malayalam U ==
Malayalam independent vowel and vowel sign U.

U (ഉ) is a vowel of the Malayalam abugida. It ultimately arose from the Brahmi letter, via the Grantha letter u. Like in other Indic scripts, Malayalam vowels have two forms: an independent letter for word and syllable-initial vowel sounds, and a vowel sign for changing the inherent "a" of consonant letters. Vowel signs in Malayalam usually sit adjacent to its base consonant - below, to the left, right, or both left and right, but are always pronounced after the consonant sound. Some vowel signs, such as U, can also form a ligature with some consonants, although this is much more common in old-style paḻaya lipi texts than in the modern reformed paḻaya lipi orthography.

Malayalam U vowel sign on ക, ഖ, ഗ, ഘ, & ങ: Ku, Khu, Gu, Ghu and Ngu in paḻaya lipi.

== Odia U ==
Odia independent vowel and vowel sign U.

U (ଉ) is a vowel of the Odia abugida. It ultimately arose from the Brahmi letter, via the Siddhaṃ letter u. Like in other Indic scripts, Odia vowels have two forms: an independent letter for word and syllable-initial vowel sounds, and a vowel sign for changing the inherent "a" of consonant letters. Vowel signs in Odia usually sit adjacent to its base consonant - below, to the left, right, or both left and right, but are always pronounced after the consonant sound. No base consonants are altered in form when adding a vowel sign, and there are no consonant+vowel ligatures in Odia.

== Kaithi U ==
Kaithi independent vowel and vowel sign U.

U (𑂇) is a vowel of the Kaithi abugida. It ultimately arose from the Brahmi letter, via the Siddhaṃ letter U. Like in other Indic scripts, Kaithi vowels have two forms: an independent letter for word and syllable-initial vowel sounds, and a vowel sign for changing the inherent "a" of consonant letters. Vowel signs in Kaithi usually sit adjacent to its base consonant - below, to the left, right, or both left and right, but are always pronounced after the consonant sound. No base consonants are altered in form when adding a vowel sign, and there are no consonant+vowel ligatures in Kaithi.

== Tirhuta U ==
Tirhuta independent vowel and vowel sign U.

U (𑒅) is a vowel of the Tirhuta abugida. It ultimately arose from the Brahmi letter, via the Siddhaṃ letter U. Like in other Indic scripts, Tirhuta vowels have two forms: an independent letter for word and syllable-initial vowel sounds, and a vowel sign for changing the inherent "a" of consonant letters. Vowel signs in Tirhuta usually sit adjacent to its base consonant - below, to the left, right, or both left and right, but are always pronounced after the consonant sound. Several consonants are altered in form when adding the U vowel mark, unlike most Tirhuta vowels.

=== Conjuncts of 𑒅 ===
As is common in Indic scripts, Tirhuta joins letters together to form ligatures and conjuncts. Unlike most Indic scripts, Tirhuta not only has ligatures and conjuncts of consonant clusters, but also forms ligatures of consonants + vowel marks. U (𑒅) is one of the vowels that form ligatures with some consonants.

- 𑒦୍ (bʰ) + 𑒅 (u) gives the ligature bʰu:

- 𑒡୍ (dʱ) + 𑒅 (u) gives the ligature dʱu:

- 𑒠୍ (d) + 𑒅 (u) gives the ligature du:

- 𑒑୍ (g) + 𑒅 (u) gives the ligature gu:

- 𑒯୍ (h) + 𑒅 (u) gives the ligature hu:

- 𑒖୍ (j) + 𑒅 (u) gives the ligature ju:

- 𑒏୍ (k) + 𑒅 (u) gives the ligature ku:

- 𑒪୍ (l) + 𑒅 (u) gives the ligature lu:

- 𑒧୍ (m) + 𑒅 (u) gives the ligature mu:

- 𑒝୍ (ṇ) + 𑒅 (u) gives the ligature ṇu:

- 𑒢୍ (n) + 𑒅 (u) gives the ligature nu:

- 𑒣୍ (p) + 𑒅 (u) gives the ligature pu:

- 𑒩୍ (r) + 𑒅 (u) gives the ligature ru:

- 𑒬୍ (ʃ) + 𑒅 (u) gives the ligature ʃu:

- 𑒭୍ (ṣ) + 𑒅 (u) gives the ligature ṣu:

- 𑒮୍ (s) + 𑒅 (u) gives the ligature su:

- 𑒞୍ (t) + 𑒅 (u) gives the ligature tu:

- 𑒨୍ (y) + 𑒅 (u) gives the ligature yu:

== Comparison of U ==
The various Indic scripts are generally related to each other through adaptation and borrowing, and as such the glyphs for cognate letters, including U, are related as well.

Comparison of U in different scripts

Aramaic
Kharoṣṭhī 𐨂	Ashoka Brahmi / 𑀼	Kushana Brahmi (Note: The middle "Kushana" form of Brahmi is a later style that emerged as Brahmi scripts were beginning to proliferate. Gupta Brahmi was definitely a stylistic descendant from Kushana, but other Brahmi-derived scripts may have descended from earlier forms.) / 𑀼	Tocharian (Note: Tocharian is probably derived from the middle period "Kushana" form of Brahmi, although artifacts from that time are not plentiful enough to establish a definite succession.)
Gupta Brahmi / 𑀼	Pallava
Kadamba -
Bhaiksuki 𑰄 / 𑰲	Siddhaṃ / 𑖲	Grantha 𑌉 / 𑍁	Cham ꨂ / ꨭ
Sinhala උ / ු	Pyu / Old Mon (Note: Pyu and Old Mon are probably the precursors of the Burmese script, and may be derived from either the Pallava or Kadamba script) -
Tibetan ུ	Newa 𑐄 / 𑐸	Ahom 𑜤	Malayalam ഉ / ു
Telugu ఉ / ు	Burmese ဥ / ု
Lepcha ᰪ	Ranjana	Saurashtra ꢆ / ꢸ	Dives Akuru 𑤄 / 𑤳
Kannada ಉ / ು	Kayah Li ꤢꤨ
Limbu ᤢ	Soyombo (Note: May also be derived from Devangari (see bottom left of table)) 𑩓	Khmer ឧ / ុ	Tamil / ு
Chakma 𑄅 / 𑄪	Tai Tham ᩏ / ᩩ
Meitei Mayek ꯨ	Gaudi -	Thai ุ	Lao ຸ
Tai Le ᥧ
Marchen 𑲲	Tirhuta 𑒅 / 𑒳	New Tai Lue ᦳ	Tai Viet ꪴ	Aksara Kawi 𑼈 / 𑼸
'Phags-pa ꡟ	Odia ଉ / ୁ	Sharada 𑆇 / 𑆶	Rejang ꥈ	Batak ᯥ / ᯮ	Buginese ᨘ
Zanabazar Square 𑨃	Bengali–Assamese / ু	Takri 𑚄 / 𑚰	Javanese ꦈ / ꦸ	Balinese ᬉ / ᬸ	Makasar 𑻴
Hangul (Note: The Origin of Hangul from 'Phags-pa is one of limited influence, inspiring at most a few basic letter shapes. Hangul does not function as an Indic abugida.) ㅜ	Northern Nagari -	Dogri 𑠄 / 𑠰	Laṇḍā -	Sundanese ᮅ / ᮥ	Baybayin ᜂ / ᜓ
Modi 𑘄 / 𑘳	Gujarati ઉ / ુ	Khojki 𑈃 / 𑈯	Khudabadi 𑊴 / 𑋣	Mahajani 𑅒	Tagbanwa ᝢ / ᝳ
Devanagari / ु	Nandinagari 𑦤 / 𑧔	Kaithi / 𑂳	Gurmukhi ਉ / ੁ	Multani 𑊂	Buhid ᝂ / ᝓ
Canadian Syllabics (Note: Although the basic letter forms of the Canadian Aboriginal Syllabics were derived from handwritten Devanagari letters, this abugida indicates vowel sounds by rotations of the letter form, rather than the use of vowel diacritics as is standard in Indic abugidas.) -	Soyombo (Note: May also be derived from Ranjana (see above)) 𑩓	Sylheti Nagari ꠃ / ꠥ	Gunjala Gondi 𑵤 / 𑶍	Masaram Gondi (Note: Masaram Gondi acts as an Indic abugida, but its letterforms were not derived from any single precursor script.) 𑴄 / 𑴴	Hanuno'o ᜢ / ᜳ

== Character encodings of U ==
Most Indic scripts are encoded in the Unicode Standard, and as such the letter U in those scripts can be represented in plain text with unique codepoint. U from several modern-use scripts can also be found in legacy encodings, such as ISCII.

Character information
Preview							ఉ		ଉ		ಉ		ഉ		ઉ		ਉ	
Unicode name	DEVANAGARI LETTER U		BENGALI LETTER U		TAMIL LETTER U		TELUGU LETTER U		ORIYA LETTER U		KANNADA LETTER U		MALAYALAM LETTER U		GUJARATI LETTER U		GURMUKHI LETTER U	
Encodings	decimal	hex	dec	hex	dec	hex	dec	hex	dec	hex	dec	hex	dec	hex	dec	hex	dec	hex
Unicode	2313	U+0909	2441	U+0989	2953	U+0B89	3081	U+0C09	2825	U+0B09	3209	U+0C89	3337	U+0D09	2697	U+0A89	2569	U+0A09
UTF-8	224 164 137	E0 A4 89	224 166 137	E0 A6 89	224 174 137	E0 AE 89	224 176 137	E0 B0 89	224 172 137	E0 AC 89	224 178 137	E0 B2 89	224 180 137	E0 B4 89	224 170 137	E0 AA 89	224 168 137	E0 A8 89
Numeric character reference	&#2313;	&#x909;	&#2441;	&#x989;	&#2953;	&#xB89;	&#3081;	&#xC09;	&#2825;	&#xB09;	&#3209;	&#xC89;	&#3337;	&#xD09;	&#2697;	&#xA89;	&#2569;	&#xA09;
ISCII	168	A8	168	A8	168	A8	168	A8	168	A8	168	A8	168	A8	168	A8	168	A8

Character information
Preview	Ashoka Kushana Gupta				𑌉	
Unicode name	BRAHMI LETTER U		SIDDHAM LETTER U		GRANTHA LETTER U	
Encodings	decimal	hex	dec	hex	dec	hex
Unicode	69641	U+11009	71044	U+11584	70409	U+11309
UTF-8	240 145 128 137	F0 91 80 89	240 145 150 132	F0 91 96 84	240 145 140 137	F0 91 8C 89
UTF-16	55300 56329	D804 DC09	55301 56708	D805 DD84	55300 57097	D804 DF09
Numeric character reference	&#69641;	&#x11009;	&#71044;	&#x11584;	&#70409;	&#x11309;

Character information
Preview	ꡟ		𑐄		𑰄		𑆇	
Unicode name	PHAGS-PA LETTER U		NEWA LETTER U		BHAIKSUKI LETTER U		SHARADA LETTER U	
Encodings	decimal	hex	dec	hex	dec	hex	dec	hex
Unicode	43103	U+A85F	70660	U+11404	72708	U+11C04	70023	U+11187
UTF-8	234 161 159	EA A1 9F	240 145 144 132	F0 91 90 84	240 145 176 132	F0 91 B0 84	240 145 134 135	F0 91 86 87
UTF-16	43103	A85F	55301 56324	D805 DC04	55303 56324	D807 DC04	55300 56711	D804 DD87
Numeric character reference	&#43103;	&#xA85F;	&#70660;	&#x11404;	&#72708;	&#x11C04;	&#70023;	&#x11187;

Character information
Preview	ဥ		ᩏ	
Unicode name	MYANMAR LETTER U		TAI THAM LETTER U	
Encodings	decimal	hex	dec	hex
Unicode	4133	U+1025	6735	U+1A4F
UTF-8	225 128 165	E1 80 A5	225 169 143	E1 A9 8F
Numeric character reference	&#4133;	&#x1025;	&#6735;	&#x1A4F;

Character information
Preview	ឧ	
Unicode name	KHMER INDEPENDENT VOWEL QU	
Encodings	decimal	hex
Unicode	6055	U+17A7
UTF-8	225 158 167	E1 9E A7
Numeric character reference	&#6055;	&#x17A7;

Character information
Preview	උ		𑄅		ᥧ		𑤄		ꢆ		ꨂ	
Unicode name	SINHALA LETTER UYANNA		CHAKMA LETTER U		TAI LE LETTER U		DIVES AKURU LETTER U		SAURASHTRA LETTER U		CHAM LETTER U	
Encodings	decimal	hex	dec	hex	dec	hex	dec	hex	dec	hex	dec	hex
Unicode	3467	U+0D8B	69893	U+11105	6503	U+1967	71940	U+11904	43142	U+A886	43522	U+AA02
UTF-8	224 182 139	E0 B6 8B	240 145 132 133	F0 91 84 85	225 165 167	E1 A5 A7	240 145 164 132	F0 91 A4 84	234 162 134	EA A2 86	234 168 130	EA A8 82
UTF-16	3467	0D8B	55300 56581	D804 DD05	6503	1967	55302 56580	D806 DD04	43142	A886	43522	AA02
Numeric character reference	&#3467;	&#xD8B;	&#69893;	&#x11105;	&#6503;	&#x1967;	&#71940;	&#x11904;	&#43142;	&#xA886;	&#43522;	&#xAA02;

Character information
Preview	𑘄		𑦤		𑩓		ꠃ		𑵤			
Unicode name	MODI LETTER U		NANDINAGARI LETTER U		SOYOMBO VOWEL SIGN U		SYLOTI NAGRI LETTER U		GUNJALA GONDI LETTER U		KAITHI LETTER U	
Encodings	decimal	hex	dec	hex	dec	hex	dec	hex	dec	hex	dec	hex
Unicode	71172	U+11604	72100	U+119A4	72275	U+11A53	43011	U+A803	73060	U+11D64	69767	U+11087
UTF-8	240 145 152 132	F0 91 98 84	240 145 166 164	F0 91 A6 A4	240 145 169 147	F0 91 A9 93	234 160 131	EA A0 83	240 145 181 164	F0 91 B5 A4	240 145 130 135	F0 91 82 87
UTF-16	55301 56836	D805 DE04	55302 56740	D806 DDA4	55302 56915	D806 DE53	43011	A803	55303 56676	D807 DD64	55300 56455	D804 DC87
Numeric character reference	&#71172;	&#x11604;	&#72100;	&#x119A4;	&#72275;	&#x11A53;	&#43011;	&#xA803;	&#73060;	&#x11D64;	&#69767;	&#x11087;

Character information
Preview	𑒅	
Unicode name	TIRHUTA LETTER U	
Encodings	decimal	hex
Unicode	70789	U+11485
UTF-8	240 145 146 133	F0 91 92 85
UTF-16	55301 56453	D805 DC85
Numeric character reference	&#70789;	&#x11485;

Character information
Preview	𑚄		𑠄		𑈃		𑊴		𑅒		𑊂	
Unicode name	TAKRI LETTER U		DOGRA LETTER U		KHOJKI LETTER U		KHUDAWADI LETTER U		MAHAJANI LETTER U		MULTANI LETTER U	
Encodings	decimal	hex	dec	hex	dec	hex	dec	hex	dec	hex	dec	hex
Unicode	71300	U+11684	71684	U+11804	70147	U+11203	70324	U+112B4	69970	U+11152	70274	U+11282
UTF-8	240 145 154 132	F0 91 9A 84	240 145 160 132	F0 91 A0 84	240 145 136 131	F0 91 88 83	240 145 138 180	F0 91 8A B4	240 145 133 146	F0 91 85 92	240 145 138 130	F0 91 8A 82
UTF-16	55301 56964	D805 DE84	55302 56324	D806 DC04	55300 56835	D804 DE03	55300 57012	D804 DEB4	55300 56658	D804 DD52	55300 56962	D804 DE82
Numeric character reference	&#71300;	&#x11684;	&#71684;	&#x11804;	&#70147;	&#x11203;	&#70324;	&#x112B4;	&#69970;	&#x11152;	&#70274;	&#x11282;

Character information
Preview	ᬉ		ᯥ		ꦈ		ᮅ	
Unicode name	BALINESE LETTER UKARA		BATAK LETTER U		JAVANESE LETTER U		SUNDANESE LETTER U	
Encodings	decimal	hex	dec	hex	dec	hex	dec	hex
Unicode	6921	U+1B09	7141	U+1BE5	43400	U+A988	7045	U+1B85
UTF-8	225 172 137	E1 AC 89	225 175 165	E1 AF A5	234 166 136	EA A6 88	225 174 133	E1 AE 85
Numeric character reference	&#6921;	&#x1B09;	&#7141;	&#x1BE5;	&#43400;	&#xA988;	&#7045;	&#x1B85;

Character information
Preview	ᜂ		ᝢ		ᝂ		ᜢ		𑴄	
Unicode name	TAGALOG LETTER U		TAGBANWA LETTER U		BUHID LETTER U		HANUNOO LETTER U		MASARAM GONDI LETTER U	
Encodings	decimal	hex	dec	hex	dec	hex	dec	hex	dec	hex
Unicode	5890	U+1702	5986	U+1762	5954	U+1742	5922	U+1722	72964	U+11D04
UTF-8	225 156 130	E1 9C 82	225 157 162	E1 9D A2	225 157 130	E1 9D 82	225 156 162	E1 9C A2	240 145 180 132	F0 91 B4 84
UTF-16	5890	1702	5986	1762	5954	1742	5922	1722	55303 56580	D807 DD04
Numeric character reference	&#5890;	&#x1702;	&#5986;	&#x1762;	&#5954;	&#x1742;	&#5922;	&#x1722;	&#72964;	&#x11D04;
