= Cursive =

Style of penmanship

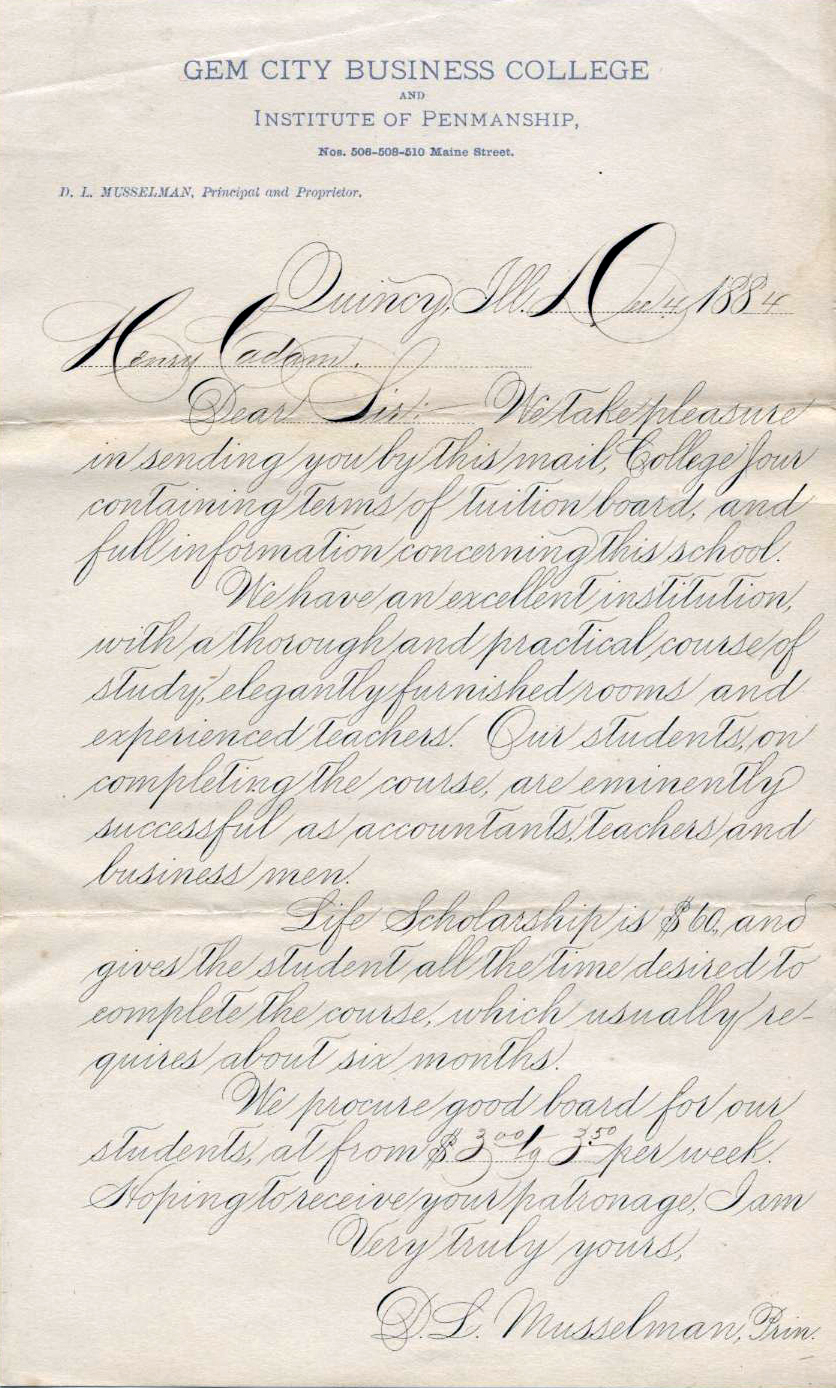
Example of classic American business cursive handwriting known as Spencerian script, from 1884

Cursive (also known as joined-up writing or real writing) is any style of penmanship in which characters are written joined in a flowing manner, generally for the purpose of making writing faster, in contrast to block letters. It varies in function and modern-day usage across languages and regions, used both publicly in artistic and formal documents and in private communication. Formal cursive is generally joined, while casual cursive combines joins with pen lifts. The writing style can be further divided into "looped", "italic", or "connected".

Many alphabets use cursive because infrequent pen lifting increases writing speed. However, more elaborate or ornamental calligraphic styles of writing can be slower to reproduce. In some alphabets, many or all letters in a word are connected, sometimes making a word one single complex stroke.

== History ==
Cursive is a style of penmanship in which the symbols of the language are written in a conjoined, or flowing, manner, generally for the purpose of making writing faster. This writing style is distinct from "print-script" using block letters, in which the letters of a word are unconnected. Not all cursive copybooks join all letters; formal cursive is generally joined, but casual cursive combines joins and pen lifts. In the Arabic, Syriac, Latin, and Cyrillic scripts, many or all letters in a word are connected (while others must not), sometimes making a word one single complex stroke. In Hebrew cursive and Roman cursive, the letters are not connected. In Maharashtra, a cursive alphabet known as the "Modi" script was used to write the Marathi language.

=== Subclasses ===
==== Ligature ====
A ligature is writing letters of words with lines connecting them so you don't have to lift the pen or pencil between letters. Commonly, some of the letters are written in a looped manner to facilitate the connections. In common printed Greek texts, the modern small letter fonts are called "cursive" (as opposed to uncial) though the letters do not connect.

==== Looped ====
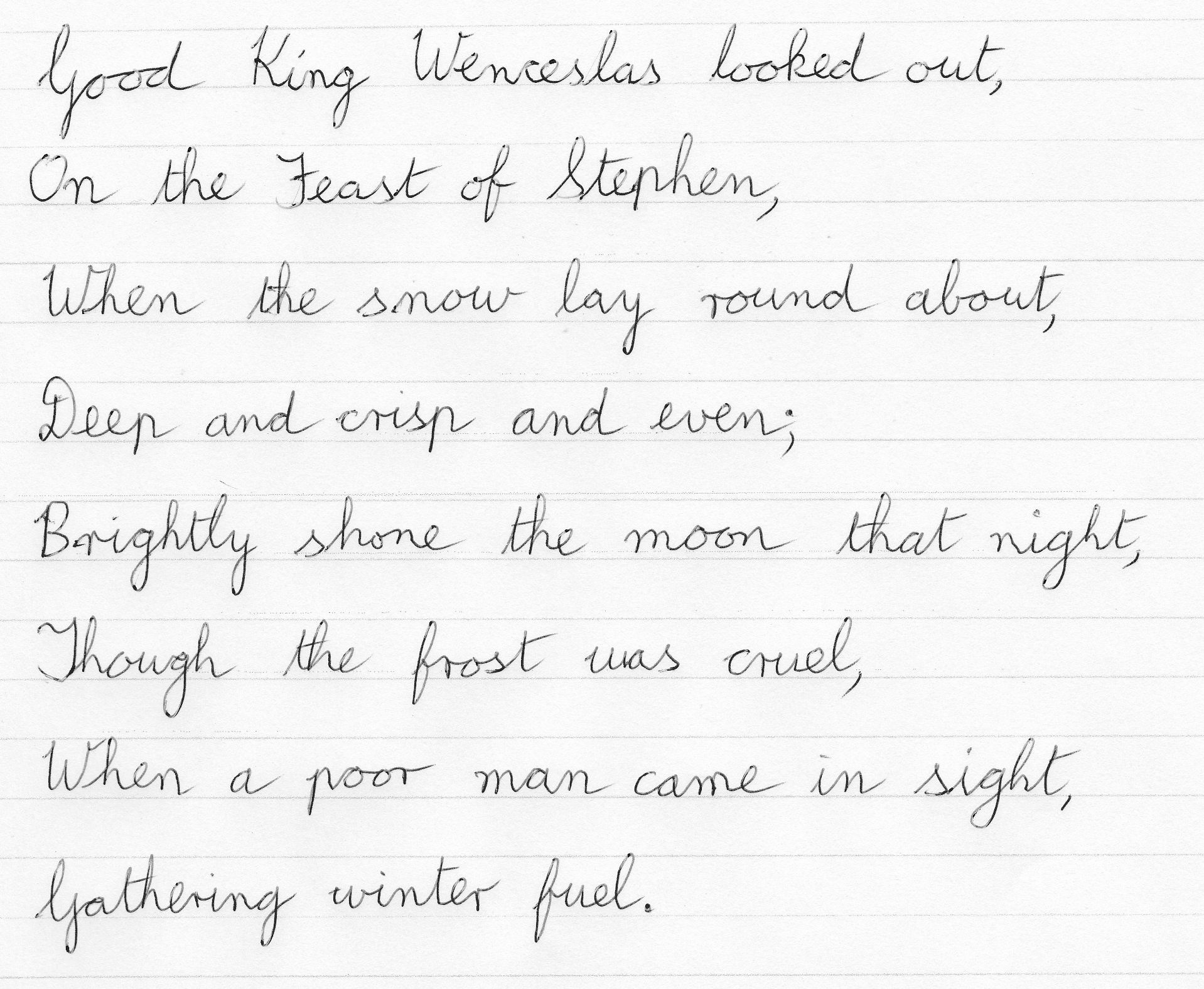
Looped cursive, as taught in Britain in the mid-20th century

In looped cursive penmanship, some ascenders and descenders have loops which allow the letters to link. This is generally what people refer to when they say "cursive" in the context of English. The letters in this style have their own unique characteristics. For example, the lowercase t is taller, while the lowercase v and w are rounder. Also, the lowercase x extends to the baseline.

==== Italic ====
Cursive italic penmanship—derived from chancery cursive—uses non-looped joins, and not all letters are joined. In italic cursive, there are no joins from g, j, q, or y, and a few other joins are discouraged. Italic penmanship became popular in the 15th-century Italian Renaissance. The term "italic" as it relates to handwriting is not to be confused with italic typed letters. Many, but not all, letters in Renaissance handwriting were joined, as most are today in cursive italic.

== Origin ==
The origins of the cursive method are associated with the practical advantages of writing speed and infrequent pen-lifting to accommodate the limitations of the quill. Quills are fragile, easily broken, and will spatter unless used properly. They also run out of ink faster than most contemporary writing utensils. Steel dip pens followed quills; they were sturdier, but still had some limitations. The individuality of a document's provenance (see Signature) also mattered, unlike machine font. Cursive was also favoured because the writing tool was rarely taken off the paper. The term cursive derives from Middle French cursif from Medieval Latin cursivus, which literally means 'running'. This term in turn derives from Latin currere ('to run, hasten'). Although by the 2010s, the use of cursive appeared to be on the decline, as of 2019 it seemed to be coming back into use.

== Arabic ==
In the Arabic abjad, most letters connect on both sides, but a small group connects only on the right side (i.e., they connect to the preceding letter but not to the following one).

Letters that connect on both sides (22 letters):

ب ت ث ج ح خ س ش ص ض ط ظ ع غ ف ق ك ل م ن ه ي

Letters that connect only on the right side (6 letters):

ا د ذ ر ز و

These six letters never connect to the letter that follows them, so their initial and medial forms look the same as their isolated and final forms, respectively.

== Bengali ==
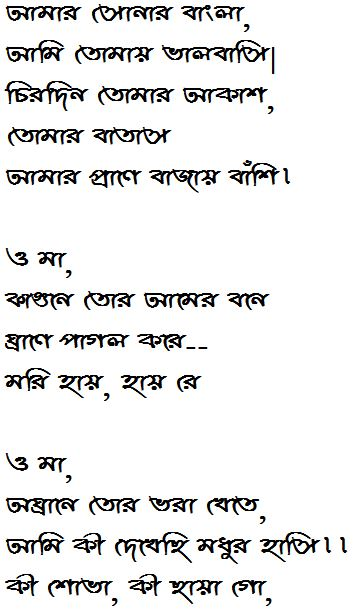
Half of the National Anthem of Bangladesh, written in cursive Bengali

In the Bengali cursive script The letters are more likely to be more curvy in appearance than in standard Bengali handwriting.

== Chinese ==
Cursive forms of Chinese characters are used in calligraphy; "running script" is the semi-cursive form and "rough script" (also called "grass script") is the cursive. The running aspect of this script has more to do with the formation and connectedness of strokes within an individual character than with connections between characters as in Western connected cursive. The latter are rare in hanzi and in the derived Japanese kanji characters, which are usually well separated by the writer.

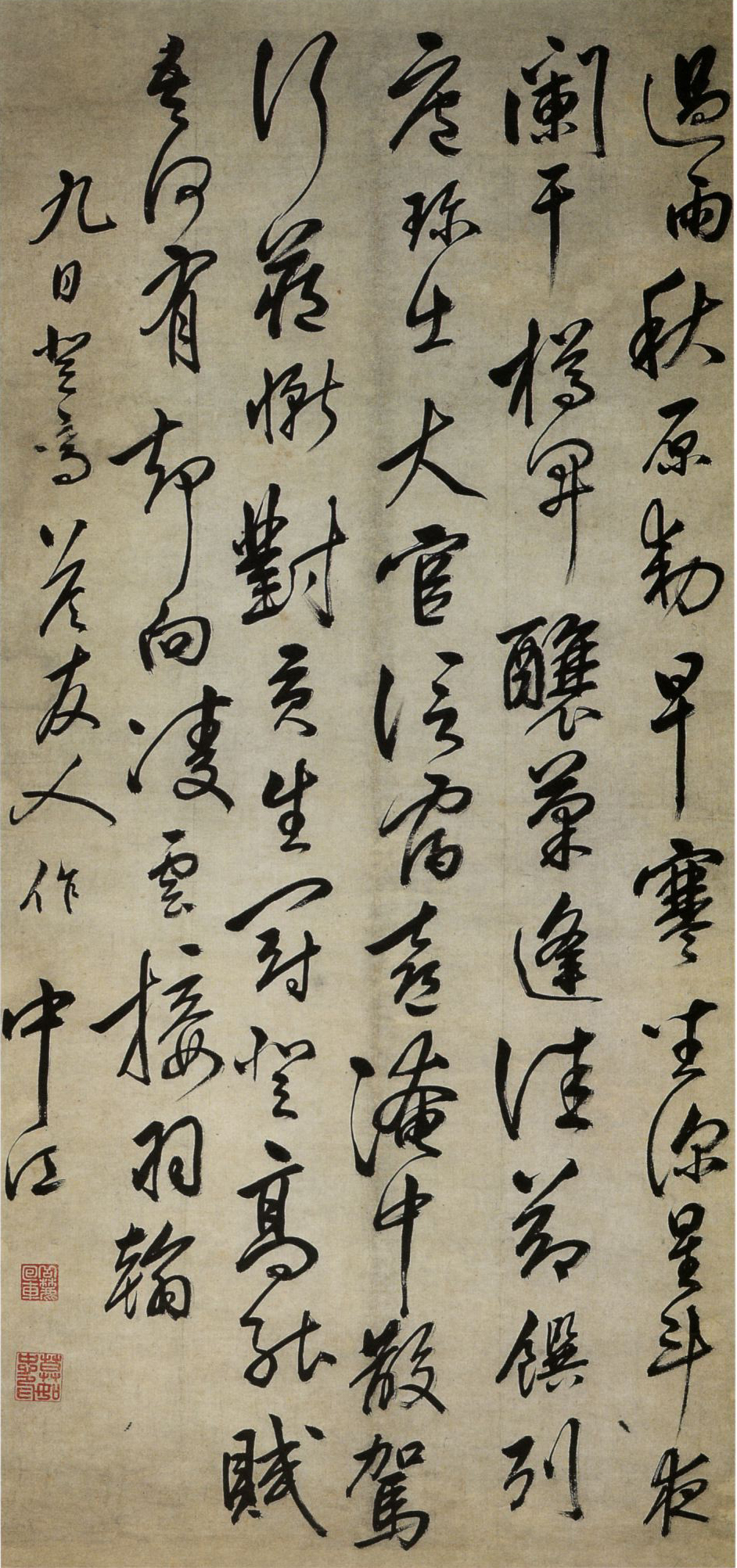
Semi-cursive style Calligraphy of Chinese poem by Mo Ruzheng

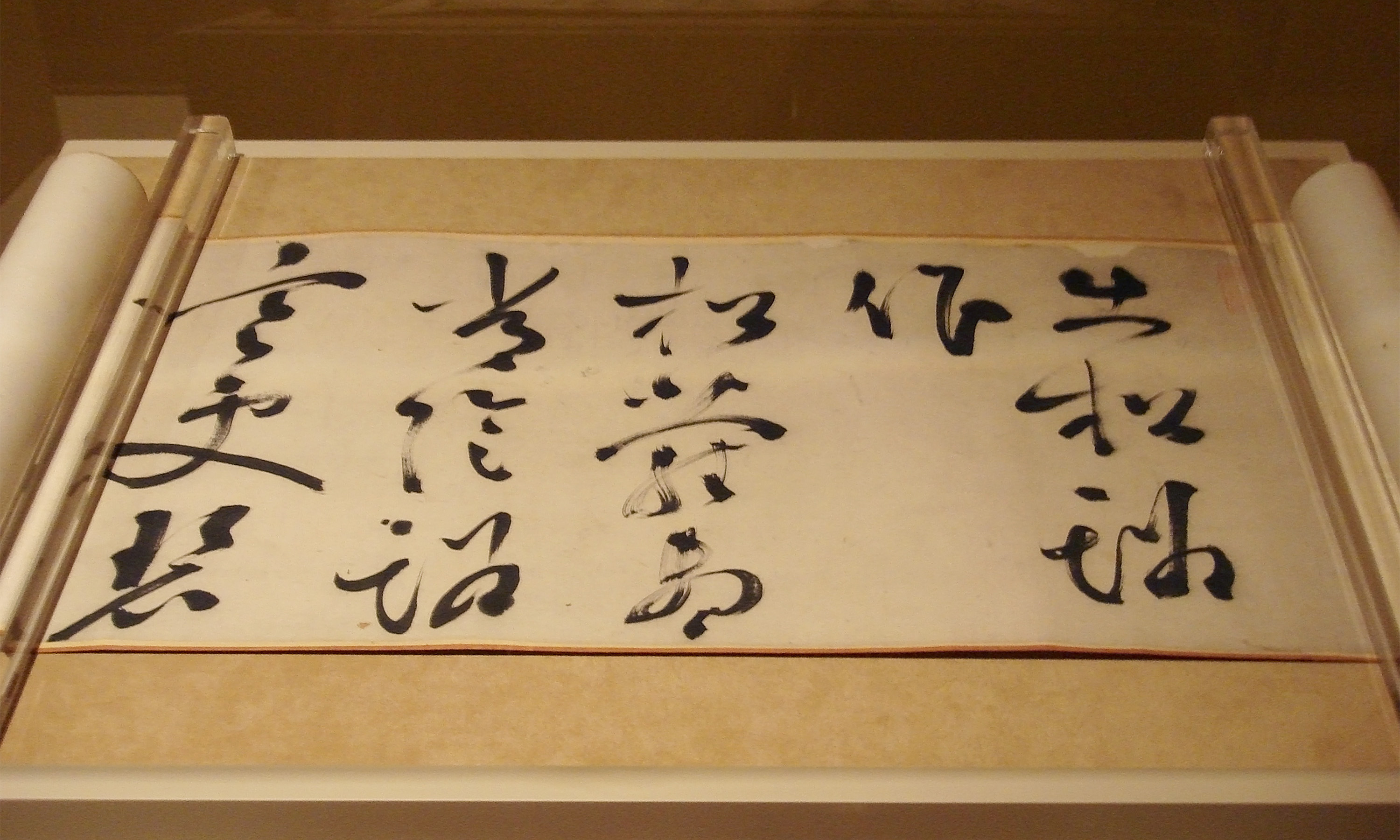
Classical poem in cursive script at Treasures of Ancient China exhibit

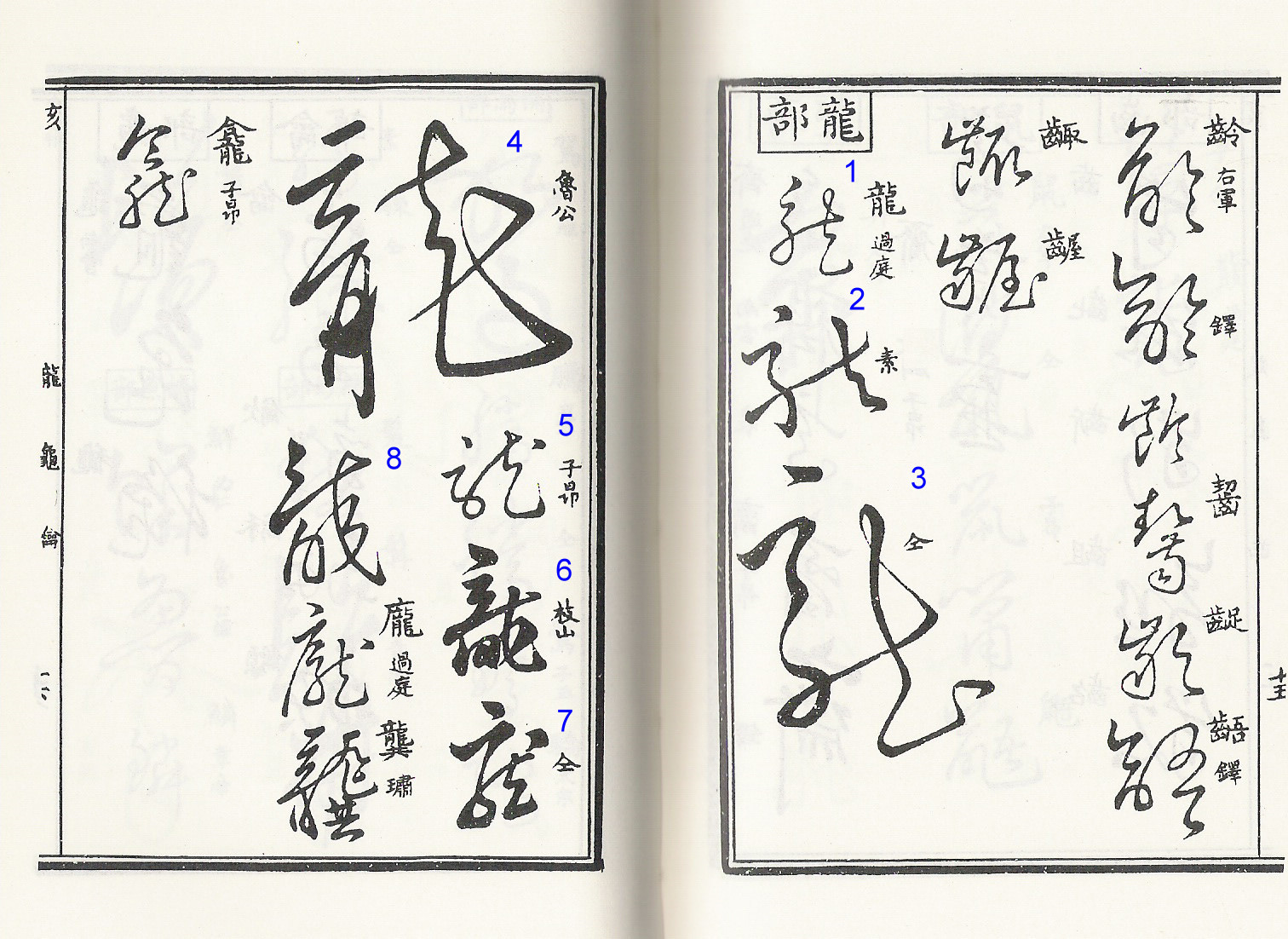
Eight cursive characters for dragon

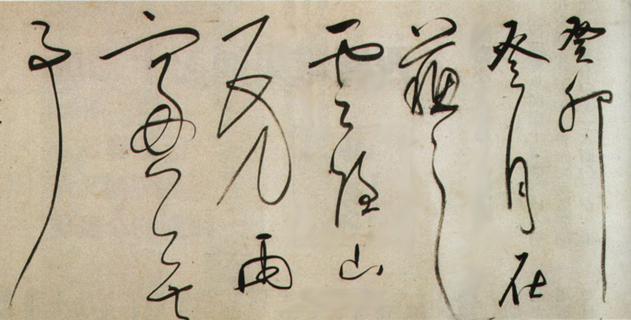
Calligraphy of both cursive and semi-cursive by Dong Qichang

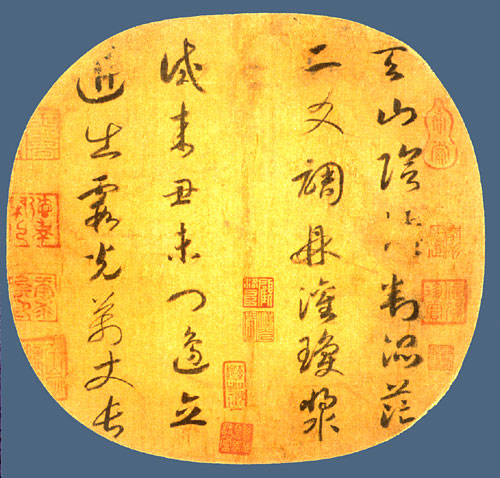
Four columns in cursive script quatrain poem, Quatrain on Heavenly Mountain. Attributed to Emperor Gaozong of Song, the tenth Chinese Emperor of the Song dynasty

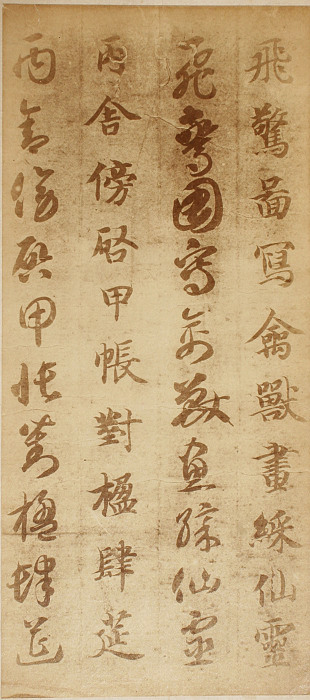
One page of the album "Thousand Character classic in formal and Cursive script" attributed to Zhi Yong

== English ==
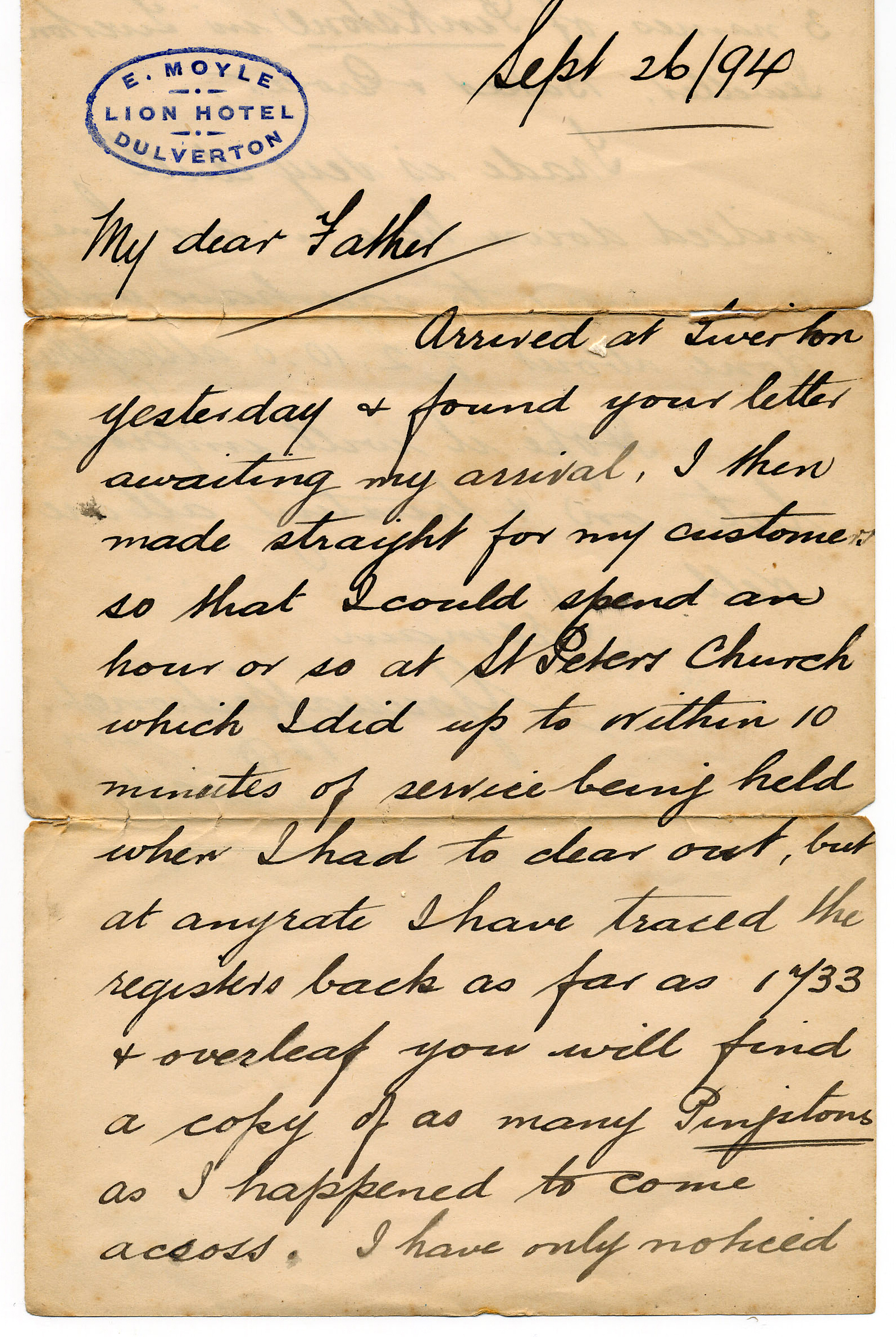
An English letter from 1894, written in Continuous Cursive

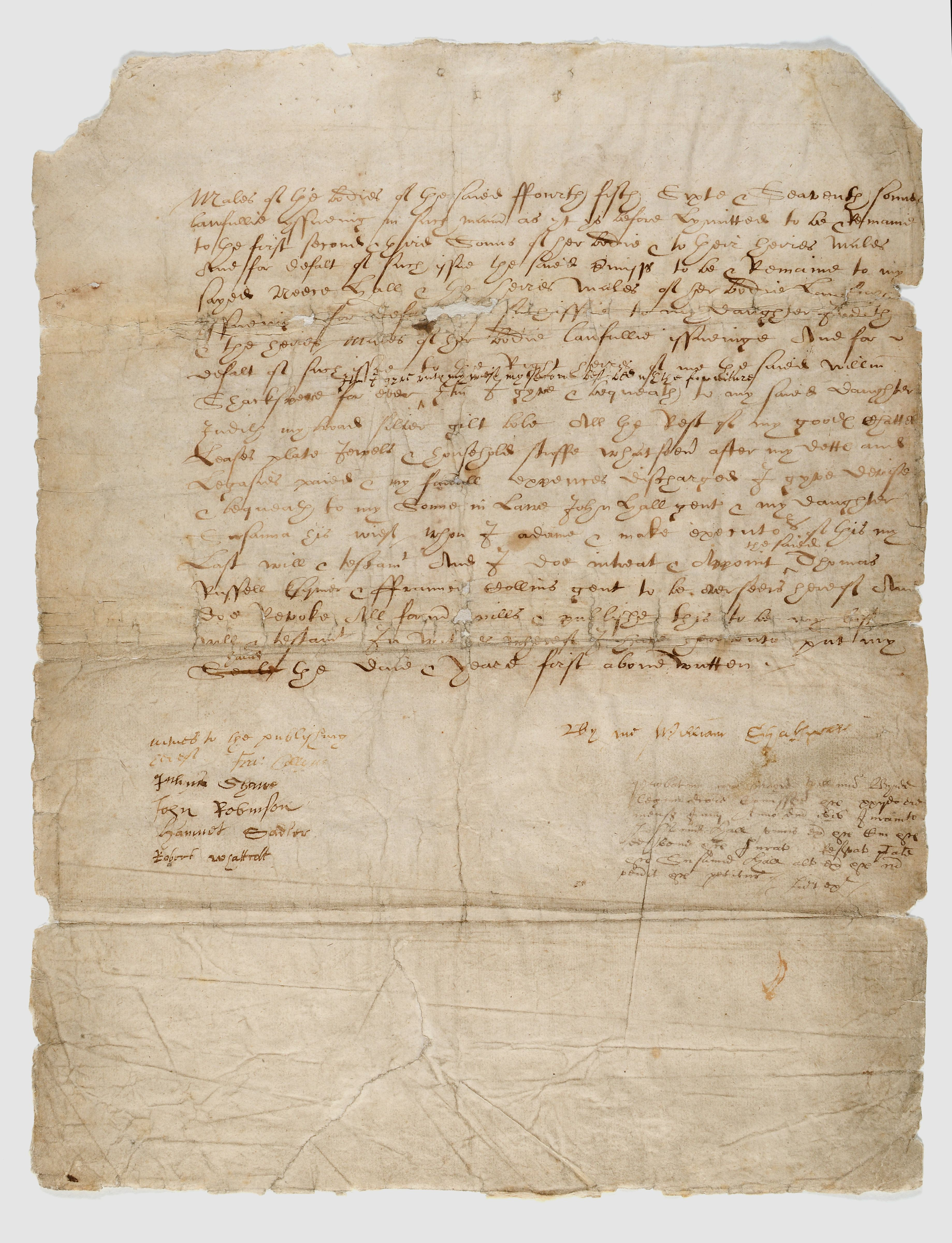
William Shakespeare's will, written in secretary hand

Cursive writing was used in English before the Norman Conquest. Anglo-Saxon charters typically include a boundary clause written in Old English in a cursive script. A cursive handwriting style—secretary hand—was widely used for both personal correspondence and official documents in England from early in the 16th century.

Cursive handwriting developed into something approximating its current form from the 17th century, but its use was neither uniform, nor standardised either in England itself or elsewhere in the British Empire. In the English colonies of the early 17th century, most of the letters are clearly separated in the handwriting of William Bradford, though a few were joined as in a cursive hand. In England itself, Edward Cocker had begun to introduce a version of the French ronde style, which was then further developed and popularised throughout the British Empire in the 17th and 18th centuries as round hand by John Ayers and William Banson.

=== Cursive writing in the United Kingdom ===
Today there is no standardised teaching script stipulated in the various national curricula for schools in the United Kingdom, only that one font style needs to be used consistently throughout the school. In both the cursive and the continuous cursive writing styles, letters are created through joining lines and curve shapes in a particular way. Once pupils have learnt how to clearly form single letters, they are taught how single letters can be joined to form a flowing script.

Characteristics of cursive and continuous cursive scripts:

	Cursive	Continuous cursive
Starting point for letters	Variable	
Finishing point for letters	Always on the writing line (except for o, r, v and w, which have a top exit stroke)	
Single letter formation	Letters taught with exit strokes only	Letters taught with entry and exit strokes

Whether cursive or continuous cursive is to be favoured remains a subject of debate. While many schools in the United Kingdom are opting to teach continuous cursive throughout the year groups, often starting in Reception, critics have argued that conjoined writing styles leave many children struggling with the high level of gross and fine motor coordination required.

=== Cursive writing in North America ===
==== Development in the 18th and 19th centuries ====
In the American colonies, on the eve of their independence from the Kingdom of Great Britain, it is notable that Thomas Jefferson joined most, but not all the letters when drafting the United States Declaration of Independence. However, a few days later, Timothy Matlack professionally re-wrote the presentation copy of the Declaration in a fully joined, cursive hand. Eighty-seven years later, in the middle of the 19th century, Abraham Lincoln drafted the Gettysburg Address in a cursive hand that would not look out of place today.

Not all such cursive, then or now, joined all of the letters within a word.

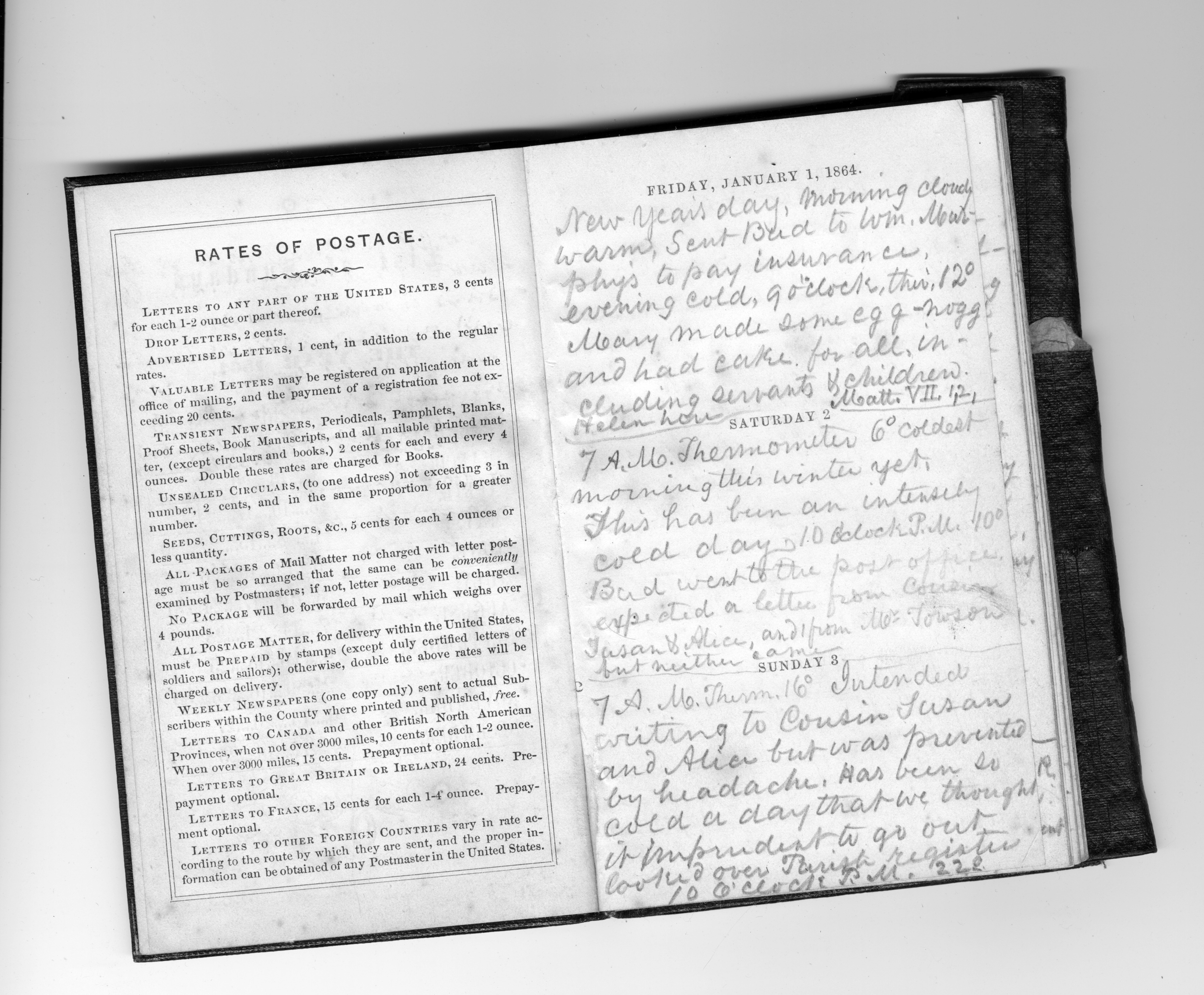
Cursive handwriting from the 19th-century US

In both the British Empire and the United States in the 18th and 19th centuries, before the typewriter, professionals used cursive for their correspondence. This was called a "fair hand", meaning it looked good, and firms trained all their clerks to write in exactly the same script.

Although women's handwriting had noticeably different particulars from men's, the general forms were not prone to rapid change. In the mid-19th century, most children were taught the contemporary cursive; in the United States, this usually occurred in second or third grade (around ages seven to nine). Few simplifications appeared as the middle of the 20th century approached.

After the 1960s, a movement originally begun by Paul Standard in the 1930s to replace looped cursive with cursive italic penmanship resurfaced. It was motivated by the claim that cursive instruction was more difficult than it needed to be, that conventional (looped) cursive was unnecessary, and it was easier to write in cursive italic. Because of this, various new forms of cursive italic appeared, including Getty-Dubay Italic, and Barchowsky Fluent Handwriting. In the 21st century, some of the surviving cursive writing styles are Spencerian, Palmer Method, Zaner–Bloser, and D'Nealian script.

==== Decline of English cursive in the United States ====
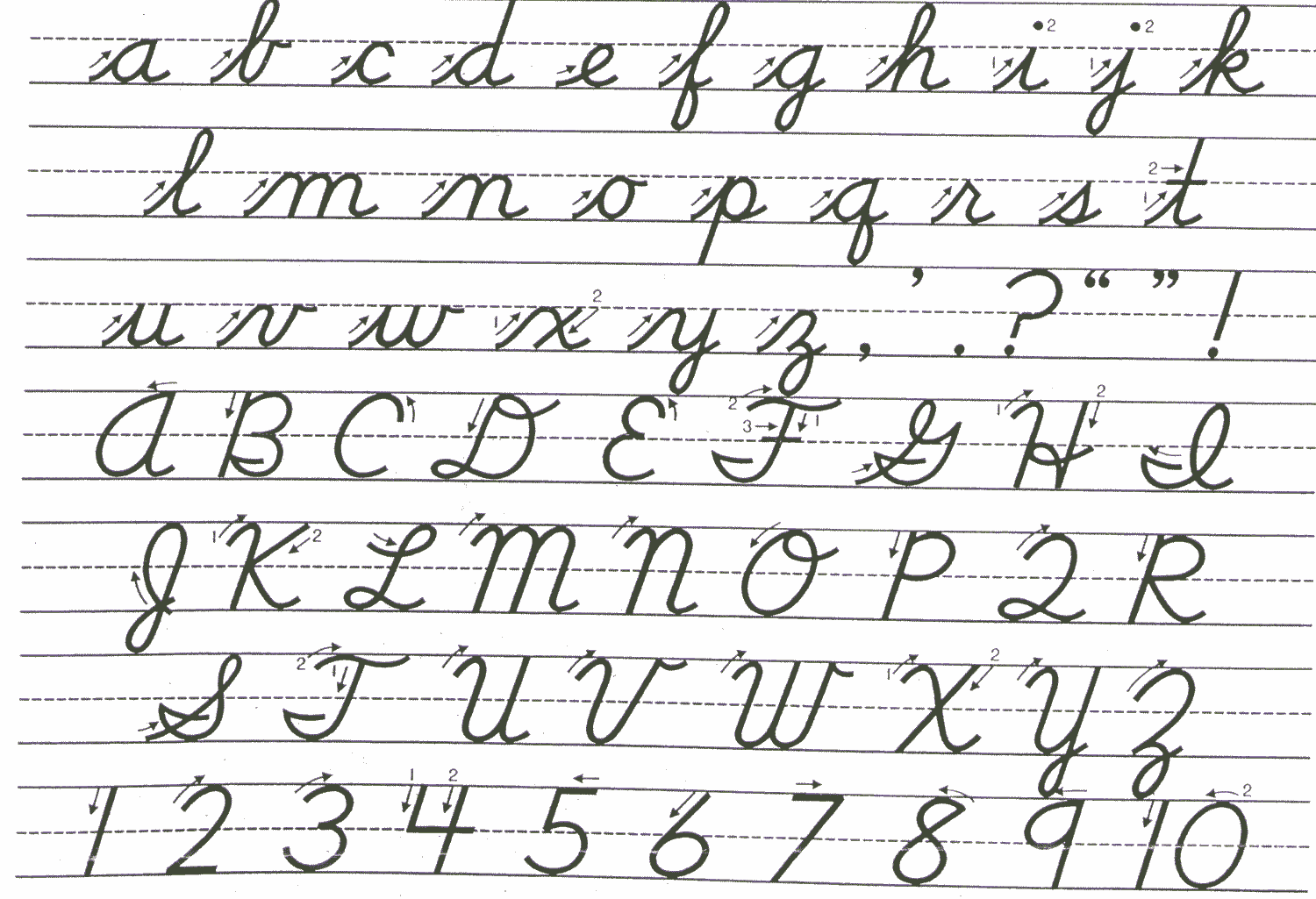
D'Nealian script, a cursive alphabet, shown in lower case and upper case

Numerous factors have affected the declining use of English cursive in the United States. Largely, they have been technologically based, but in the 2000s cultural changes (such as diminished instruction of educators how to teach it) have also contributed to its marginalisation. However, by the 2020s, “back to basics“ movements have emerged advocating for its preservation.

The declining emphasis on using cursive began in the 20th century, first from the introduction of the typewriter and its widespread adoption by the 1920s. The post-World War II proliferation of the inexpensive ballpoint pen added convenience to writing by hand and eliminated the flourishes liquid ink and flexible metal tips had allowed. In the digital era, the introduction of technologies such as the word processor and personal computer in the 1980s and smartphone in the 2000s have increasingly displaced all forms of handwriting, most significantly cursive.

Cursive has also been in decline throughout the 21st century because it is no longer perceived as necessary. The Fairfax Education Association, the largest teachers' union in Fairfax County, Virginia, has called cursive a "dying art".

In the 2006 SAT, an American university matriculation exam, only 15 percent of the students wrote their essay answers in cursive. However, students might be discouraged from using cursive on standardised tests because they will receive lower marks if their answers are hard to read, and some graders may have difficulties reading cursive. Nevertheless, in 2007, a survey of 200 teachers of first through third grades in all 50 American states, 90 percent of respondents said their schools required the teaching of cursive. In spite of this mandate, a nationwide survey in 2008 found elementary school teachers lacking formal training in teaching handwriting; only 12 percent reported having taken a course in how to teach it.

In 2012, the American states of Indiana and Hawaii announced that their schools would no longer be required to teach cursive (but will still be permitted to), and instead will be required to teach "keyboard proficiency". Nationwide Common Core State Standards (which do not include instruction in cursive) were proposed in 2009 and had been adopted by 44 states as of July 2011—all of which have debated whether to augment them with cursive.

==== Conservation efforts and effects on the learning disabled ====
Despite the decline in the day-to-day use of cursive, it is being reintroduced to the curriculum of some schools in the United States. California passed cursive handwriting legislation in 2023, adding to a wave of state legislation between 2013 and 2023 that requires the incorporation of cursive handwriting into elementary education. Other states such as Idaho, Kansas, Massachusetts, North Carolina, South Carolina, New Jersey, and Tennessee had already mandated cursive in schools as a part of the Back to Basics programme designed to maintain the integrity of cursive handwriting. Cursive instruction is required by grade 5 in Illinois, starting with the 2018–2019 school year.

Many historical documents, such as the United States Constitution, are written in cursive. Some argue the inability to read cursive therefore precludes one from being able to fully appreciate such documents in their original format.

Maria Montessori argued that beginning handwriting instruction with vertical strokes was unnecessarily difficult, observing that children's spontaneous movements tended towards curves instead.

Students with dyslexia, who have difficulty learning to read because their brains have difficulty associating sounds and letter combinations efficiently, have found that cursive can help them with the decoding process because it integrates hand-eye coordination, fine motor skills, and other brain and memory functions. A 2020 high-density EEG study of children and young adults found that handwriting activated brain regions associated with learning and memory to a greater extent than typewriting, leading the authors to conclude that handwriting practice provides favourable conditions for learning. However, students with dysgraphia may be badly served, or even substantially hindered, by demands for cursive.

== German ==
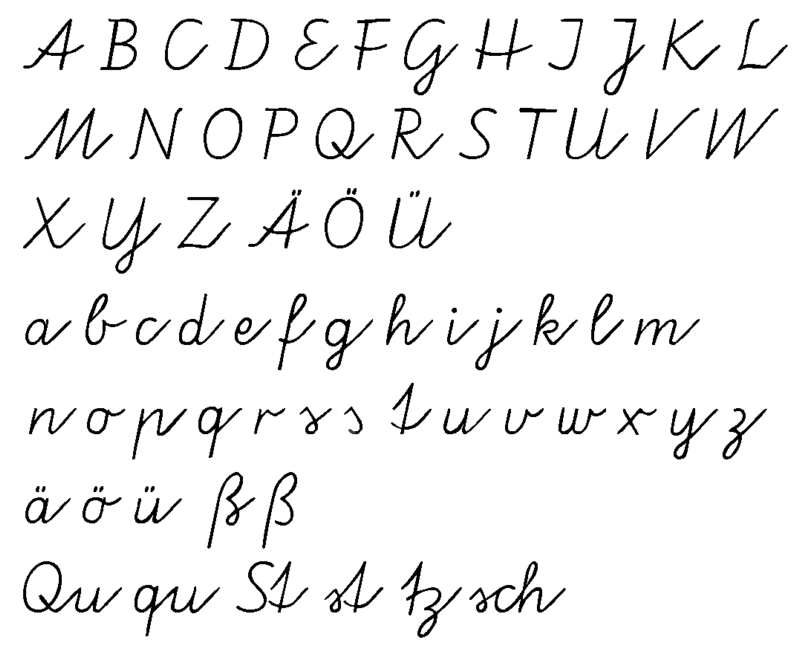
Kurrent (left, pre-19th century) and Vereinfachte Ausgangsschrift (right, from 1969)

Up to the 19th century, Kurrent (also known as German cursive) was used in German-language longhand. Kurrent was not used exclusively, but rather in parallel to modern cursive (which is the same as English cursive). Writers used both cursive styles: location, contents and context of the text determined which style to use. A successor of Kurrent, Sütterlin, was widely used in the period 1911–1941 until the Nazi Party banned it and its printed equivalent Fraktur. German speakers brought up with Sütterlin continued to use it well into the post-war period.

Today, three different styles of cursive writing are taught in German schools, the Lateinische Ausgangsschrift (introduced in 1953), the Schulausgangsschrift (1968), and the Vereinfachte Ausgangsschrift (1969). The German National Primary Schoolteachers' Union has proposed replacing all three with Grundschrift, a simplified form of non-cursive handwriting adopted by Hamburg schools.

== Greek ==
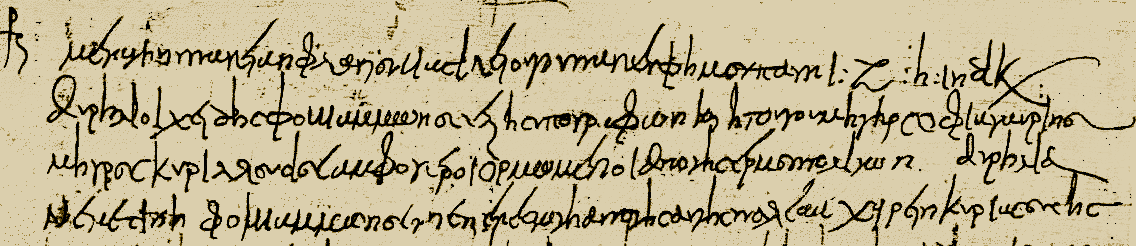
Greek cursive script, 6th century CE

The Greek alphabet has had several cursive forms in the course of its development. In antiquity, a cursive form of handwriting was used in writing on papyrus. It employed slanted and partly connected letter forms as well as many ligatures. Some features of this handwriting were later adopted into Greek minuscule, the dominant form of handwriting in the medieval and early modern era. In the 19th and 20th centuries, an entirely new form of cursive Greek, more similar to contemporary Western European cursive scripts, was developed.

== Marathi ==
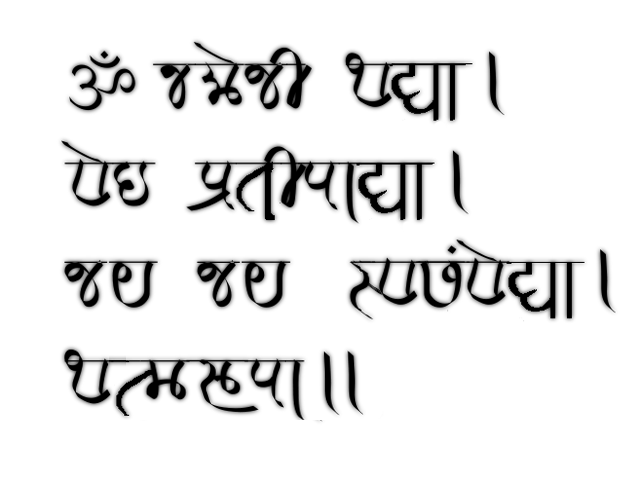
A verse from the Dnyaneshwari in the Modi script

Modi is a cursive script used to write Marathi that is thought to be derived from the Devanagari script. It was used alongside Devanagari until the 20th century as a shorthand script for quick writing in business and administration. Due to the promotion of the Balbodh variant of Devanagari as the standard writing system for Marathi, Modi largely fell out of use by the mid-20th century. Since then there have been attempts to revive this script.

A distinctive feature of this script is that the head stroke is written before the letters, in order to produce a "ruled page" for writing in lines. It has several characteristics that facilitate writing so that moving from one character to the next minimises lifting the pen from the paper for dipping in ink. Some characters are "broken" versions of their Devanagari counterparts. Many characters are more circular in shape. The long 'ī' (ई) and short 'u' (उ) are used in place of the short 'i' (इ) and long 'ū' (ऊ) respectively.

== Roman ==
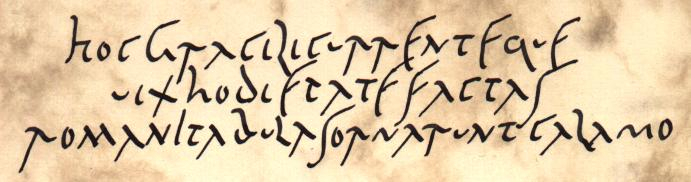
Example of old Roman cursive

Roman cursive is a form of handwriting (or a script) used in ancient Rome and to some extent into the Middle Ages. It is customarily divided into old (or ancient) cursive, and new cursive. Old Roman cursive, also called majuscule cursive and capitalis cursive, was the everyday form of handwriting used for writing letters, by merchants writing business accounts, by schoolchildren learning the Latin alphabet, and even by emperors issuing commands. New Roman, also called minuscule cursive or later cursive, developed from old cursive. It was used from approximately the 3rd century to the 7th century, and uses letter forms that are more recognisable to modern eyes; "a", "b", "d", and "e" have taken a more familiar shape, and the other letters are proportionate to each other rather than varying wildly in size and placement on a line.

== Russian ==
The standard modern Russian Cyrillic cursive alphabet with uppercase and lowercase letters, used in school education

The Russian Cursive Cyrillic alphabet is used (instead of the block letters) when handwriting the modern Russian language. While several letters resemble Latin counterparts, many of them represent different sounds. Most handwritten Russian, especially personal letters and schoolwork, uses the cursive Russian (Cyrillic) alphabet although use of block letters in private writing has been rising. Most children in Russian schools are taught in the first grade how to write using this Russian script.

== Examples ==
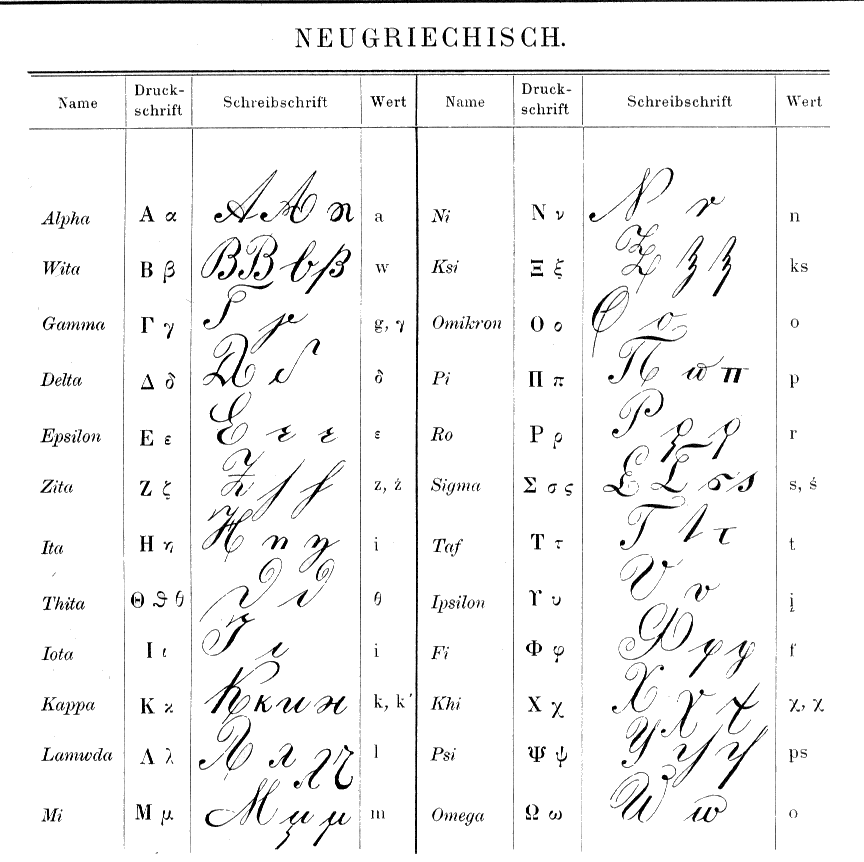
Table of 19th-century Greek cursive letter forms

Letter to Manuel I of Portugal by Pero Vaz de Caminha reporting the discovery of Brazil (1 May 1500)

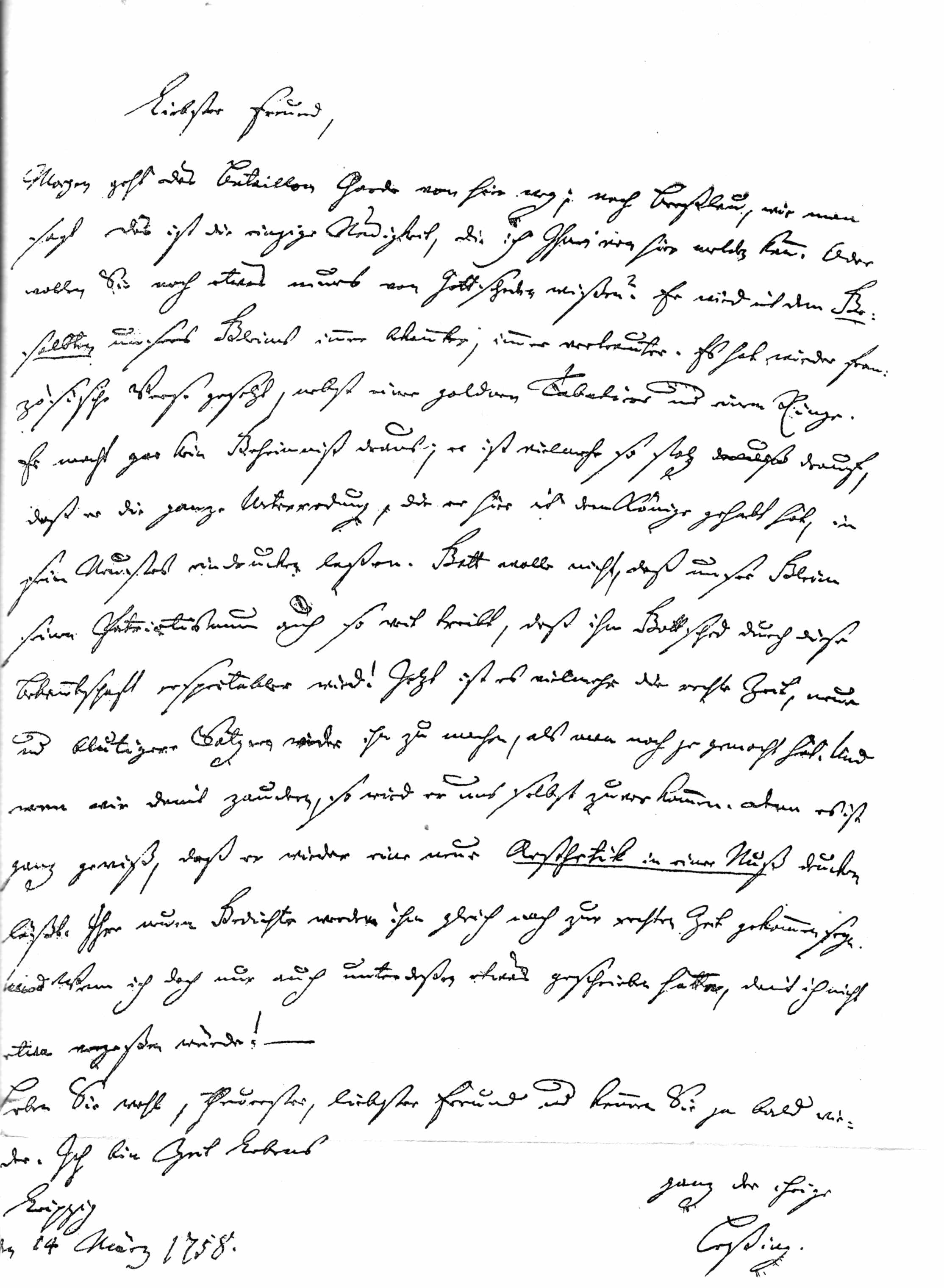
A letter from Lessing to Kleist, written in Kurrent (14 March 1758)

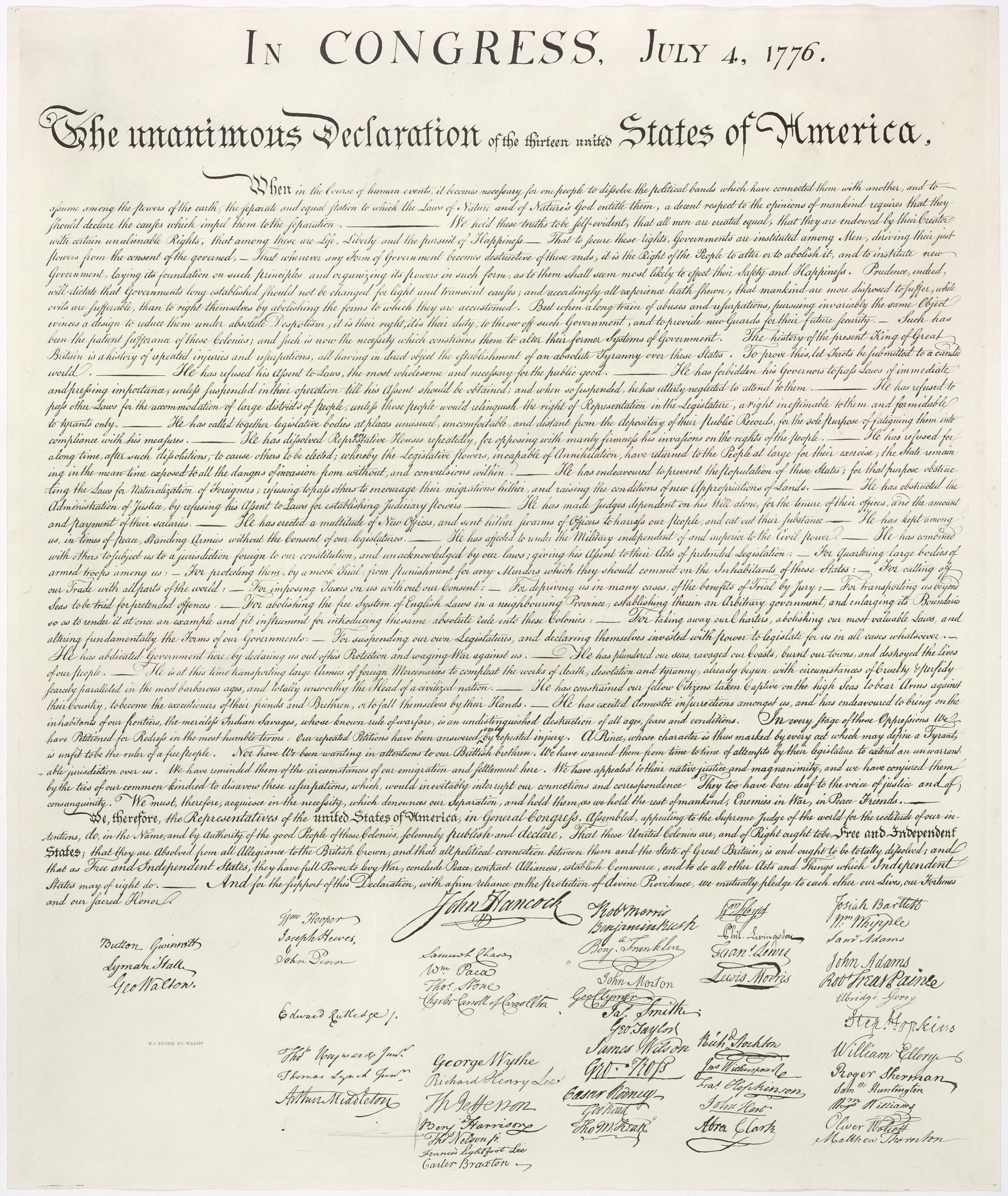
United States Declaration of Independence (4 July 1776)

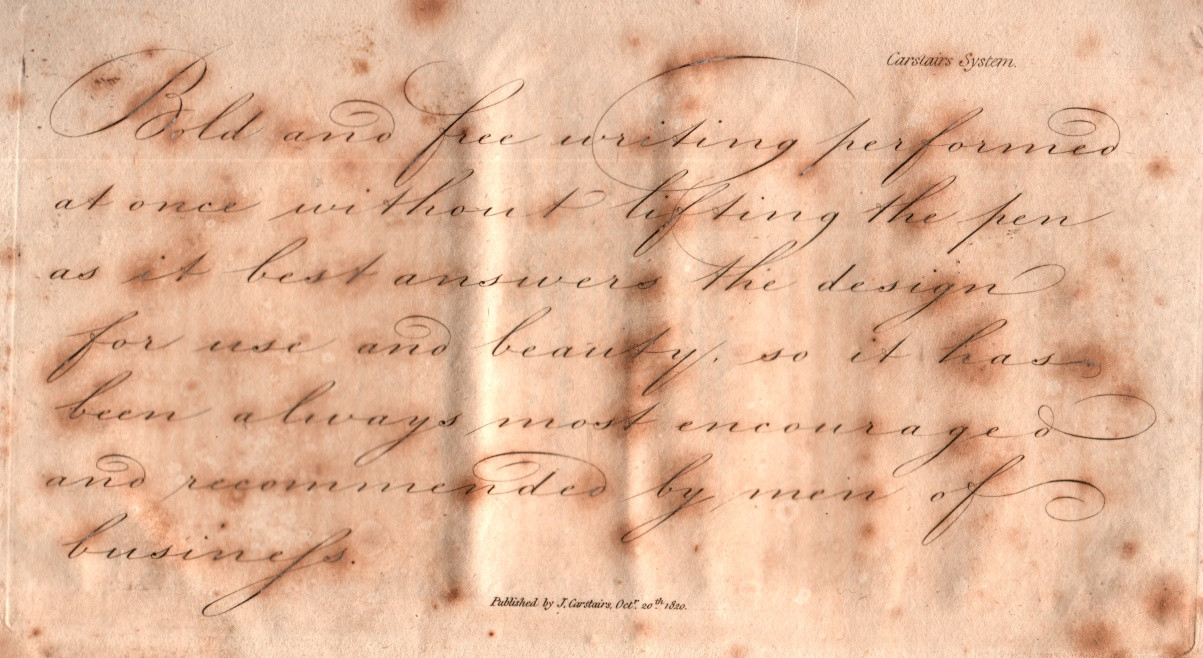
Bold running hand exemplar by English chirographer Joseph Carstairs (1820)

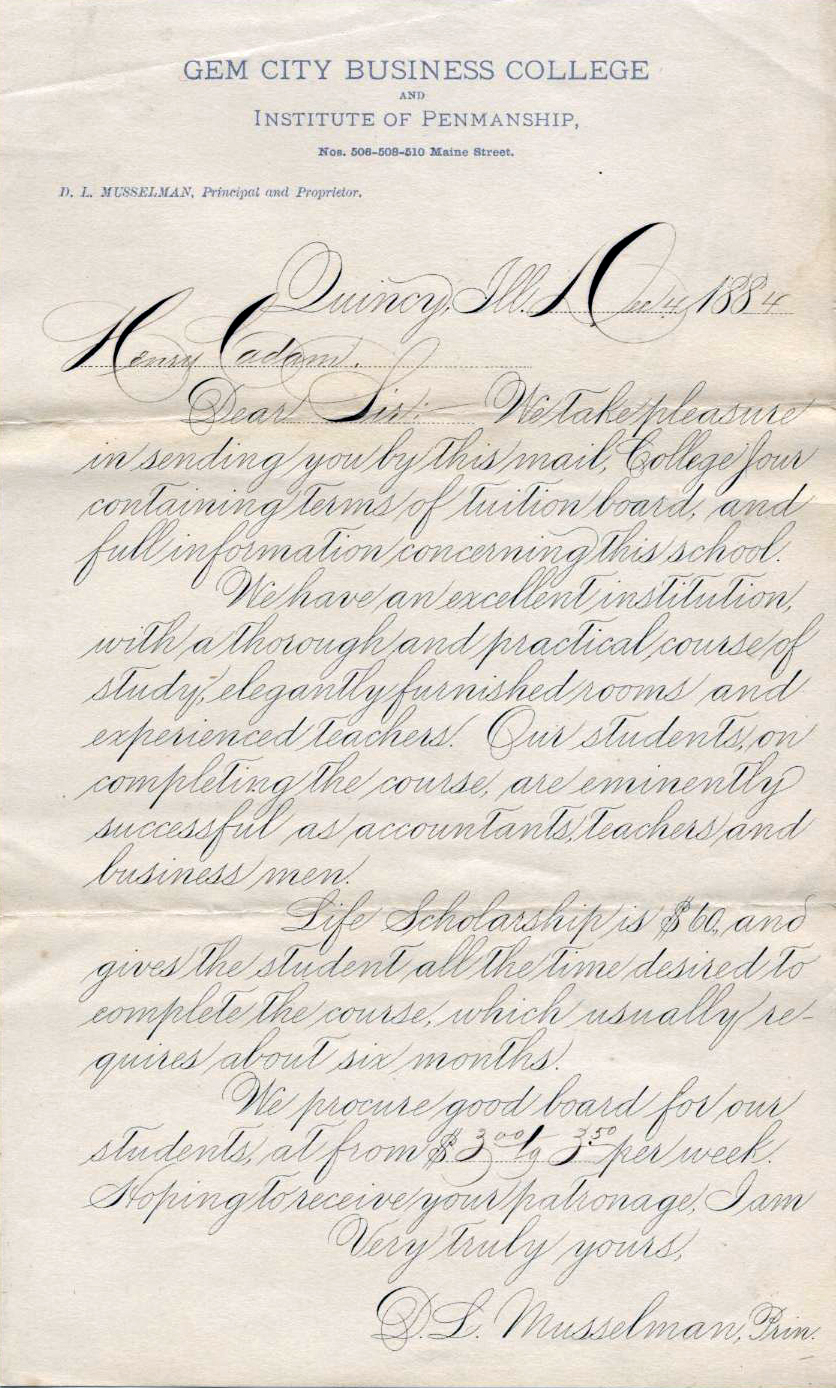
Example of classic American business handwriting known as Spencerian script (1884)

Cursive handwriting taught in Italy in the 20th and 21st centuries

== See also ==
- Bastarda
- Blackletter
- Book hand
- Chancery hand
- Court hand
- Cursive script (East Asia) (Grass script)
- Hand (writing style)
- Hieratic and Cursive hieroglyphs
- History of writing
- Library hand
- Palaeography
- Ronde script (calligraphy)
- Rotunda (script)
- Round hand
- Secretary hand
- Shorthand
- Sütterlin and Kurrent – German cursive
