= George Bickham the Elder =

British engraver and writing master

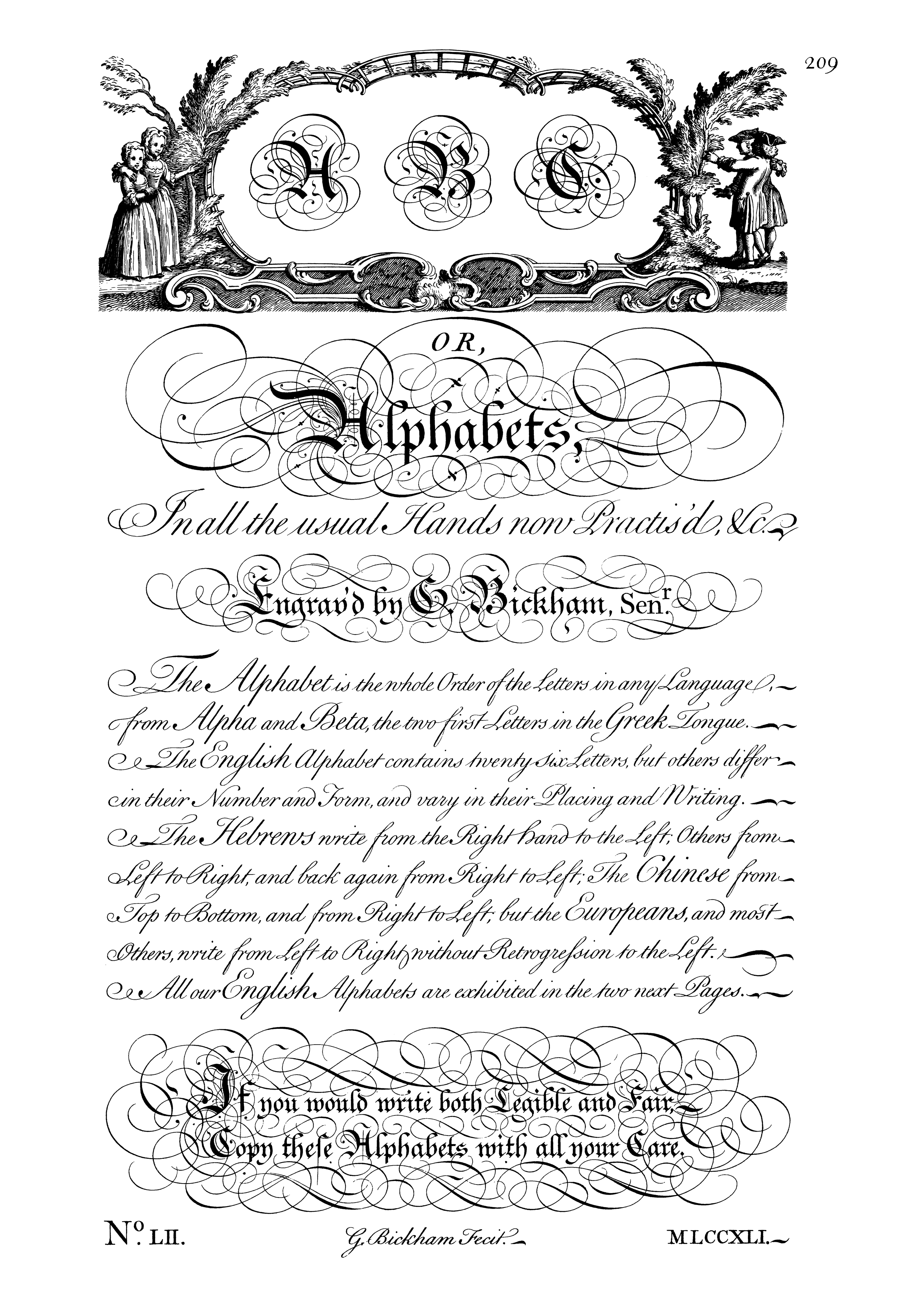
Page 209 of The Universal Penman. An example of Bickham's lettering and engraving skills.

George Bickham the Elder (1684–1758) was an English writing master and engraver. He is best known for his engraving work in The Universal Penman, a collection of writing exemplars which helped to popularise the English Round Hand script in the 18th century.

Bickham produced copybooks and business texts, as there was a strong link between writing and mathematics instruction (arithmetic and bookkeeping) in the-mid 17th century to early 18th century.

In 1733 Bickham collected penmanship samples from twenty-five London writing masters, engraved and published them in The Universal Penman, issued in fifty-two parts between 1733 and 1741. The collection became one of the most important and popular copy texts used by writing masters to instruct their pupils. It is still used by calligraphers interested in the English Round Hand or Copperplate script and was reprinted as recently as 2014.

Many of the examples in Bickham's Universal Penman focus on the importance of strong and legible writing for young men working in business or government, though there are also pieces directed towards women and girls, such as the poem inscribed by writing master Samuel Vaux, dated 1734, which declares that poor writing is a disgrace to the beauty of the writer: “An artless Scrawl ye blushing Scribler shames; All shou’d be fair that Beauteous Woman frames,” or this piece, which hints that calligraphy may have a role in encouraging romance: “Strive to excel, with Ease the Pen will move; And pretty line add Charms to infant Love.”

His son, known as George Bickham the Younger, followed in the family tradition of engraving and specialized in illustrative and musical sheets engravings. Father and son collaborated in a number of publications, including the Universal Penman and The British Monarchy, a collection of 188 plates of historical notes with 43 plates of views of English and Welsh counties. They are called views, rather than maps, though they are presented as map-like perspectives with major towns marked.

== Publications ==
- Round Text, a new coppy-book…, Hammersmith: Chas. Price, 1712.
- Youth’s Instructor in the Art of Numbers. A new cyphering book…, 1730.
- Anon. The Young Clerk’s Assistant; Or Penmanship Made Easy… Pub. Richard Ware. Engraved by George Bickham. 1733.
- The Universal Penman, 1733–1741.
- The British Monarchy, or a chorographical description…, 1748.
- The Drawing and Writing Tutor, 1748.
- The Pensylvania and Philadelphia writing-master. A new county copy-book. 1750.
- The surrey and Southwark writing-master. A new county copy-book. 1750.
- The British youth’s instructor: or, The useful penman. 1754.
- The English monarchical writing-master. 1754.

== Sources ==
- Monaghan, J. E.. Learning to read and write in colonial America, Boston, MA: University of Massachusetts Press, 2005. ISBN 1558495819
- Van Zuylen, Sybille. Penna Volans.
