= Joseph Carstairs =

English calligrapher and writing teacher in the early 19th century

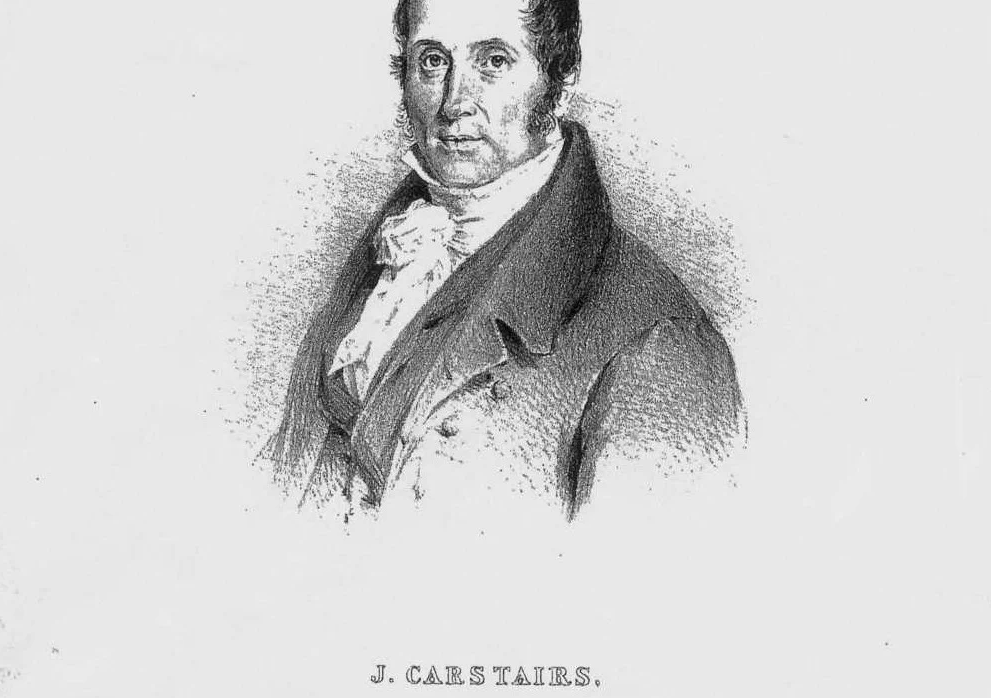
- Born: Joseph Carstairs; 2 March 1783; Lamesley, Durham, England, United Kingdom
- Died: 9 February 1844 (aged 60); London, England, United Kingdom
- Occupations: Writer; Poet
- Writing career
- Language: English

Joseph Carstairs (2 March 1783 – 9 February 1844) was an English calligrapher and writing teacher who devised a new system and style of writing in the early 19th century. Carstairs's system emphasised a "bold and free writing" when he first introduced it in 1809. In 1814 he published "A New System of Teaching the Art of Writing" which set out the core tenets of his approach emphasizing "muscular movement" up and down the page in an effort to speed up the overall pace of writing. Carstairs was one of the key influences on later cursive writing developments in the United States by Benjamin F. Foster and, in turn, the development of Spencerian penmanship by Platt Rogers Spencer in the 1840s.

== See also ==
- Spencerian Script
