= George Bickham the Younger =

English etcher and engraver (c. 1706–1771)

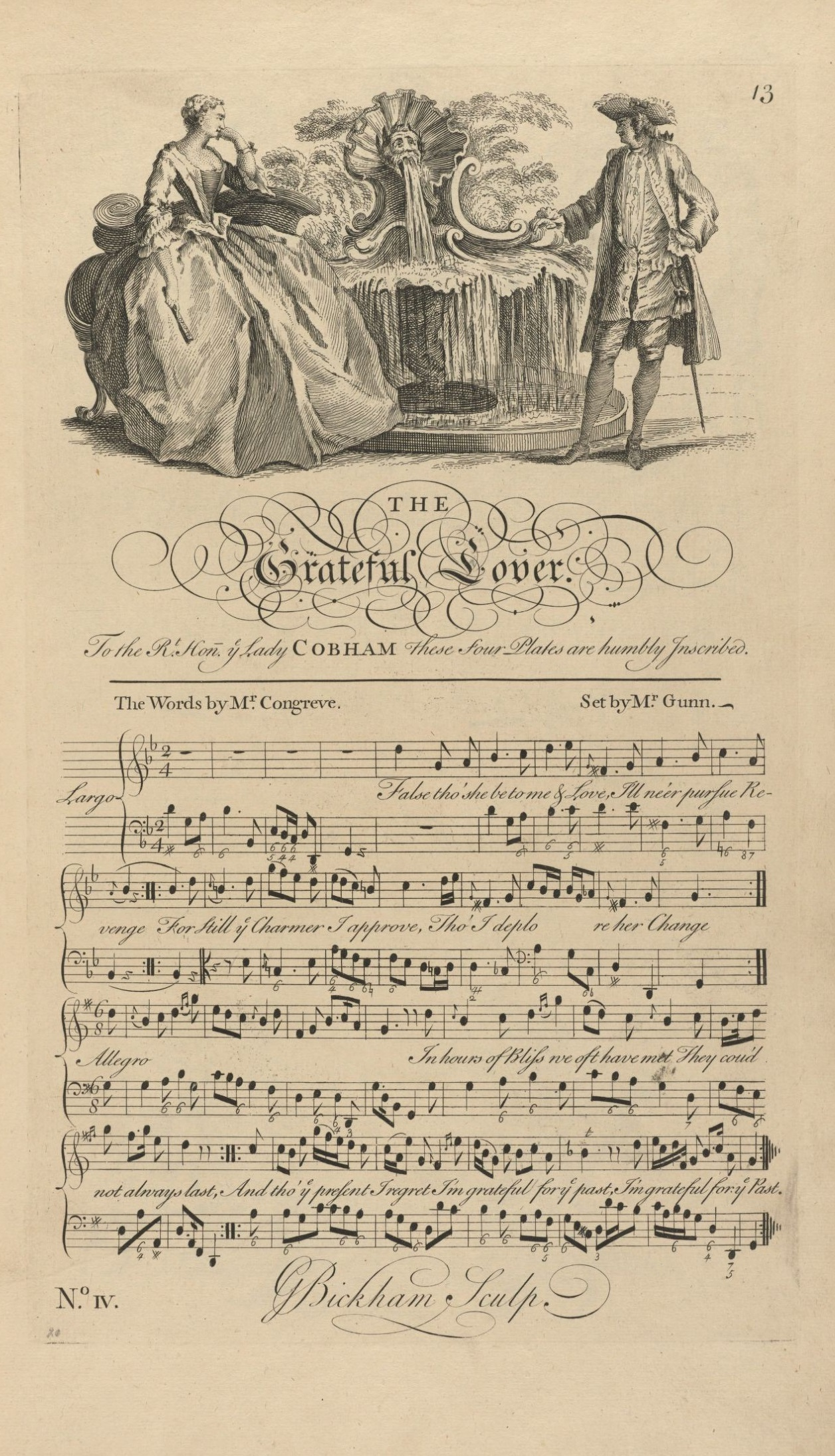
Engraving for the song "The Grateful Lover", 1737

George Bickham the Younger (c. 1706–1771) was an English etcher and engraver, a printseller, and one of the first English caricaturists. He produced didactic publications, political caricatures, and pornographical prints.

He used at least three pseudonyms:

- Cotin, E
- Ramano, M
- Richardson, George.

He was the son of the engraver George Bickham the Elder (1684–1758), who published the Universal Penman (1733–41).
