= John Ayres =

English author, scribe and publisher

John Ayres (fl. 1680–1700), an English author, scribe and publisher.

== Life ==
Ayres was of very humble origin, and the date and place of his birth are unknown. Coming up from the country a poor lad, he became footman to Mr. William Ashhurst (or Ashurst), alderman of London, then resident at Hornsey, who was knighted in 1689, and lord mayor of London in 1693-94. His master, taking a great liking to him, sent him to school, where he gained skill in writing and arithmetic. He continued some years in Ashurst's service, but marrying a fellow-servant with £200, he was enabled to set up as a teacher of writing and accounts in St. Paul's Churchyard, where his industry and ability soon procured him so many scholars that his income from teaching alone was nearly £800 a year.

About 1680 he commenced the execution and publication of calligraphic works which made him famous as one of the great reformers in the writing commonwealth, and the introducer into this country of the beautiful Italian hand. Robert More, in his essay on the First Invention of Writing, prefixed to his own Specimens of Penmanship (1716?), says: "The late Colonel Ayres (a disciple of Mr. Topham) introduced the bastard Italian hand amongst us, which by the best masters has been admitted, naturalised, and improved. Nor is it a diminution of our characters which survive him that therein the colonel was the common father of us all. He earned the glory of English penmanship far beyond his predecessors."

Ayres continued teaching and publishing scholastic works until his sudden death, from apoplexy, while regaling some friends at Vauxhall. The date of this occurrence is not known; but it was before 1709, as Rayner, his scholar, who published his Paul's Scholar's Copy Book in that year, alludes to his death.

His contemporaries speak of him as "colonel" and "major", in reference, apparently, to his position in some of the city bands.

== Publications ==
The works which he issued from the Rolling Press were:

- The Accomplished Clerk, a Copy Book shewing the natural Freedom of y Pen in Writing all the usual hands of Eng [sic], by John Ayres. Sold at the Hand and Pen in St. Paul's Churchy'd. This was engraved by the celebrated John Sturt, and apparently issued about 1680, since in 1700 he reproduced the work as (2) The Accomplished Clerk Re-graved, and in the preface speaks of his "first essays, twenty years before, to introduce the engraving of writing, and overcome the ditticulty of making the graver come up nicely for the nature and freedom of the pen". (Only three of the twenty-five plates were from the original work.)
- A work which seems to have been a second issue of his first book, The Accomplished Clerk, or Accurate Penman, dedicated to his former teacher, Mr. Thomas Topham, and dated 25 April 1683. The last of these twenty-five specimens is a fine instance of the softness, delicacy, and ornamental beauty of the new Italian hand.
- The Tradesman's Copy Book, or Apprentice's Companion, showing Varieties of Receipts, Bills, &c. written in all the modish Running-hands now used, 20 pi. ob. 4to, 1687.
- The Youth's Introduction to Trade; an Exercise Book
- The Paul's School Round-hand, Strong Running-hand, and Mercantile Round-hand, engraved by Sturt, 1700.
- Alamode Secretarie, or Practical Penman, a Writing Book, also engraved by Sturt, 28 long 8vo pl.
- The Penman's Daily Practise, Shewing much Variety of Command of hand, which he calls "a cyfering book", 34 plates of alphabets and tables of arithmetic, engraved by Sturt (n.d.).
- The Writing Master, or Tutor to Penmanship, 50 large plates of all the Varieties of English Writing (n.d.).
- A Striking Copy Book, 14 plates of capital-letters.
- Materot Redivivus, the Italian Mr., Shewing the great Variety and beauty of the Italian hand, 1690. (Materot was the famous penman of Paris.)
- The grandest, however, of all his works was A Tutor to Penmanship or the Writing Master, which he dedicated to King William III in a most pompous and yet interesting address. It was in two parts, with 48 large obl. fol. plates. Engraved by John Sturt, who also puts forward a long and curious address. The preface is dated 15 Jan. 1697-8. Ayres's portrait was in this work, also in the Accomplished Clerk (No. 3 above); but in the British Museum copies these works from Sturt's graver are wanting. There are only five of these famous books of penmanship in our national collection.

Ayres also published Arithmetic made Easie for the Use and Benefit of Tradesmen, 1693, dedicated to his former master, Sir William Ashurst, Knt. The second edition, "much corrected and enlarged", 1695, is in 12mo, 190 pp. There were many editions before and after his death;, the twelfth, published in 1714, has additional pages on bookkeeping by Charles Snell, his fellow-pupil and former rival in the reform of the art of writing, with whom it was said he had many bickerings in the course of their joint career. Ayres's poorly executed effigies is given in the later editions of his Arithmetic.
