= Wesselényi =

Wesselényi can refer to:

== People with the surname ==
- Ferenc Wesselényi (1605–1667), Hungarian military commander and palatine
- Miklós Wesselényi

== Other uses ==
- Wesselényi conspiracy
- Wesselényi Monument
