= Ernst von Hügel =

Baron Ernst von Hügel
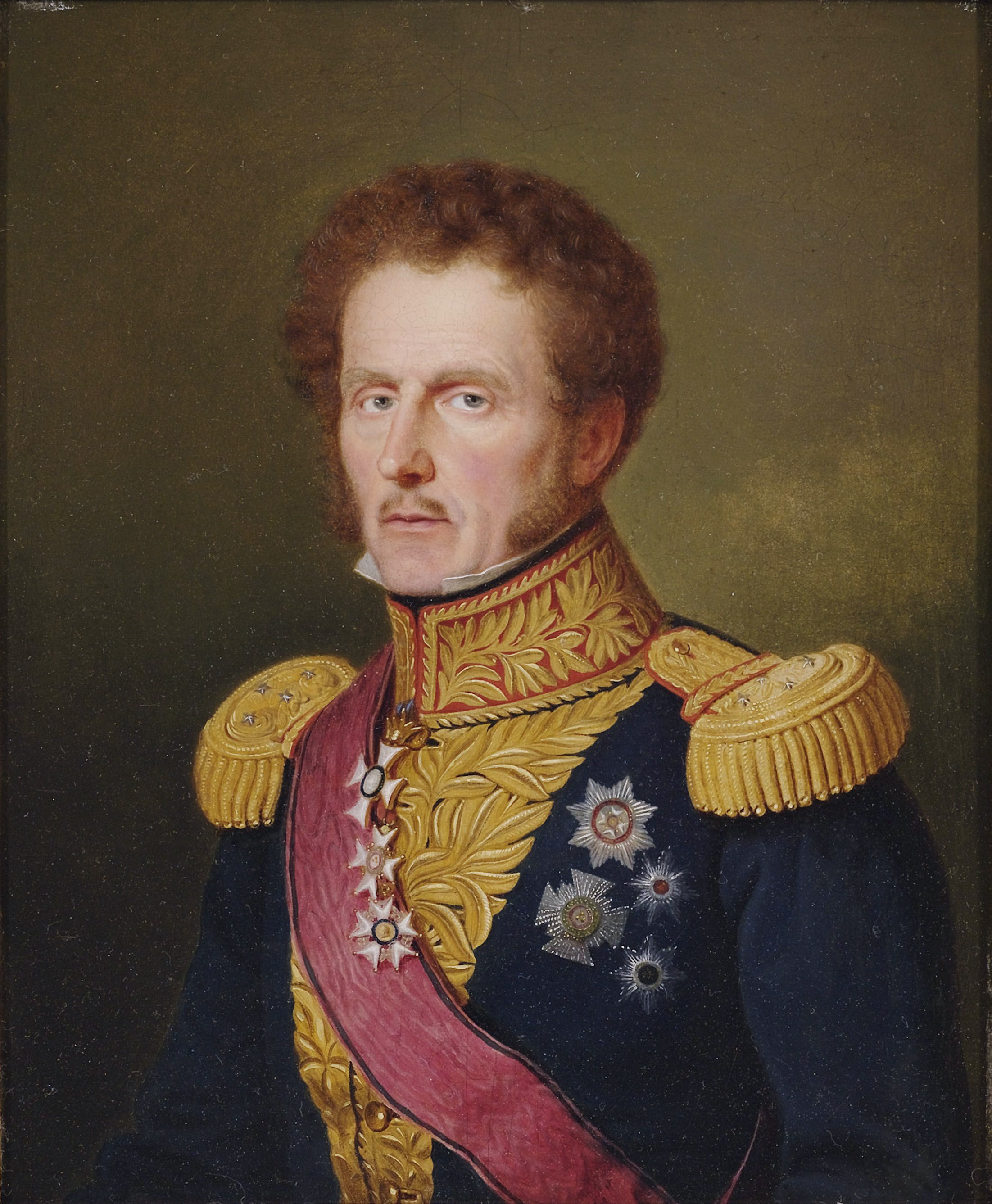
- Portrait of Ernst, Freiherr von Hügel, by Franz Seraph Stirnbrand, 1829
- Born: 26 March 1774; Ludwigsburg, Württemberg
- Died: 30 March 1849 (aged 75); Kirchheim unter Teck, Württemberg
- Military career
- Allegiance: Kingdom of Württemberg
- Branch: Württembergian Army
- Service years: 1780–1815
- Rank: Lieutenant-General
- Commands: Württembergian Army
- Conflicts: French Revolutionary Wars; Napoleonic Wars; War of the Fifth Coalition; Battle of Abensberg; Battle of Landshut (1809); Battle of Eckmühl; Battle of Aspern–Essling; Battle of Wagram; French invasion of Russia; Battle of Smolensk (1812); Battle of Borodino; Hundred Days
- Awards: Grand Cross of the Order of the Württemberg Crown; Grand Cross of the Order of the Zähringer Lion; Commander’s Cross of the Military Merit Order
- Other work: Minister of War

Ernst Eugen, Baron von Hügel (26 March 1774 – 30 March 1849) was a Württemberg General during the Napoleonic Wars and Minister of War between 1829 and 1842.

== Early life ==
Hügel was born on 26 March 1774 in Ludwigsburg. He was the son of Susanna Margaretha von Walter and Johann Andreas von Hügel (1734–1807), who had been elevated to the rank of Baron in 1801. His father's surname was originally Lux, but he took von Hügel upon being adopted by Col. Johann Theobald von Hügel. Due to the inheritance of a relative who had worked for the Dutch East India Company, the Hügel family had a considerable fortune.

Through a separate branch of the family that was ennobled in 1791, he was related to diplomat Baron Charles von Hügel, father of Friedrich von Hügel, Anatole von Hügel, and Pauline von Hügel.

== Career ==
In 1785, Hügel joined his father's regiment in the Württemberg Army and took part in the campaigns from 1792 to 1800. In 1806 he was promoted to Major and in 1807 within six months he rose to Deputy Quartermaster General with the rank of Colonel. In 1809, he was involved in the Battles of Abensberg, Landeshut, Eckmühl, Aspern, and Wagram. After these battles he was made a Major General.

In the Battle of Smolensk, Hügel stormed the two suburbs of Smolensk with the 1st Infantry Brigade from 17 to 18 August 1812. At the Battle of Borodino he captured the retreating left wing. In 1815, Hügel was Military Commissar at Wellington's headquarters. During the peace negotiations, he was appointed envoy of the Kingdom of Württemberg to the allied monarchs in Paris.

In 1816, Hügel was appointed Lieutenant general and, at the same time, made vice president of the War Department. In 1817, he became President of the War Council. Between 1829 and 1842, he headed the Ministry of War of Württemberg. During this time he was also a member of the Privy Council. From 1819 until his death he was a lifelong member of the Württembergian Chamber of Lords (German: Württembergischen Kammer der Standesherren).

== Personal life ==
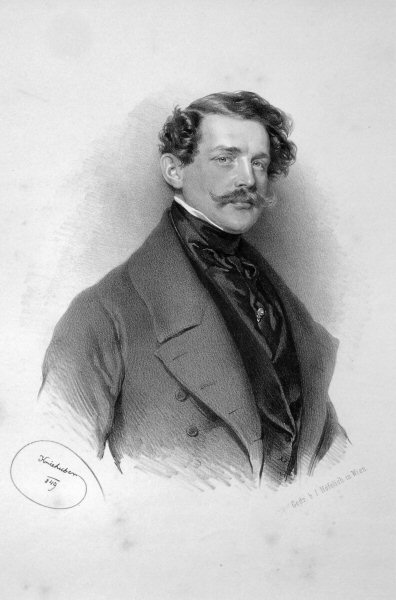
Lithograph of Baron Julius von Hügel, by Josef Kriehuber, 1849

Hügel was married four times. His first marriage was to Caroline von Rosenberg, but they divorced in 1799 without issue. On 29 December 1802, he married Baroness Charlotte Wilhelmine Schott von Schottenstein. Before her death on 4 July 1805, they had two children:

- Baron Albert von Hügel (1803–1865), German Army officer and chamberlain; he married Baroness Marie Luise Elisabeth von Uexküll-Gyllenband (they divorced and she married Dr. Theobald Kerner).
- Baron Karl Eugen von Hügel (1805–1870), Minister of Foreign Affairs who married Alexandra Vereshchagin.

His third marriage was to Luise Ernestine von Gemmingen-Guttenberg (1782–1834) on 8 April 1806. She was a daughter of Baron Ludwig Eberhard von Gemmingen-Guttenberg and Baroness Louise Auguste von Saint-André. Before her death on 28 February 1834, they were the parents of:

- Baroness Marie von Hügel (b. 1807), who married diplomat Franz von Linden, brother of Minister of State Joseph von Linden, in 1832.
- Baron Ludwig von Hügel (1808–1896), Imperial and Royal Lieutenant.
- Baron Julius von Hügel (1810–1884), Royal Württemberg chamberlain and equerry.
- Baron Philipp von Hügel (1812–1887), an Urach forester.
- Baroness Luise Ernestine von Hügel (1813–1875), who married Georg von Miltitz.
- Baron Ernst von Hügel (1815–1849)

He married for the fourth, and final, time on 28 April 1835 to Elisabeth Sophie (née von Gemmingen-Guttenberg) von Cotta (1789–1859), widow of publisher and industrial pioneer Johann Friedrich Cotta, and sister of his third wife Luise.

Baron von Hügel died on 30 March 1849 in Kirchheim unter Teck.

=== Descendants ===
Through his son Albert, he was a grandfather of Count Paul von Hügel (1835–1897), who married Princess Amalie of Teck, a daughter of Duke Alexander of Württemberg and Countess Claudine von Hohenstein. Amalie's brother, Francis, Duke of Teck, married into the British royal family; his wife, Princess Mary Adelaide of Cambridge, was a first cousin of Queen Victoria. He was the father of Queen Mary, the consort of King George V.

Through his son Karl Eugen, he was a grandfather of Baroness Alexandrine von Hügel (1843–1903), who married Count Klemens Joseph Leopold von Beroldingen, parents of Count Alexander Klemens Karl Mauritz von Beroldingen (who married American heiress Margot Marie Stone), and Egon Reichsgraf von Beroldingen (1885–1933), chairman of VfB Stuttgart and Eintracht Frankfurt, who married Nora von Beroldingen (née Kapp von Gültstein).

Through his daughter Marie, he was a grandfather of Paula von Linden (1833–1920), who married Bernhard Vollrath von Bülow (chamberlain of Mecklenburg-Schwerin and envoy to the German Confederation's Bundesversammlung); parents of Franz Joseph von Bülow (1861–1915), a prominent homosexual activist.

== Honors ==
- 1809: Commander's Cross of the Württemberg Military Order of Merit
- 1815: Grand Cross of the Civil Order of Merit
- 1829: Grand Cross of the Order of the Württemberg Crown
- 1831: Grand Cross of the Order of the Zähringer Lion
