= Albert von Hügel =

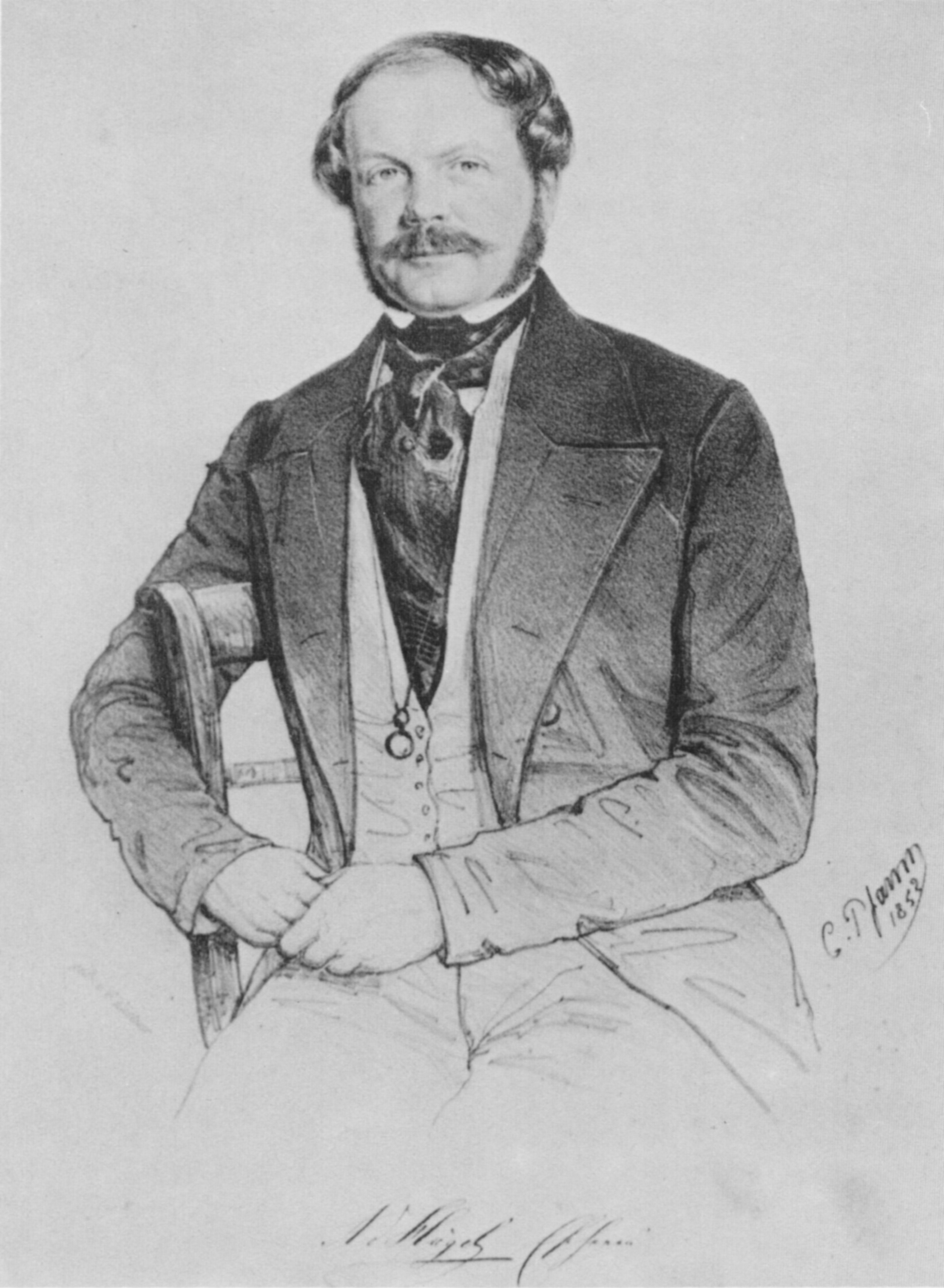
Lithograph of Baron von Hügel, by Christian Pfann, 1852

Baron Ernest Albert von Hügel (30 September 1803 – 31 December 1865) was a Royal Württemberg Chamberlain and Royal Cavalry Captain who was Lord of Eschenau.

== Early life ==
Born as a member of the noble Hügel family, Albert was the eldest child of the Württemberg General and Minister of War Baron Ernst von Hügel (1774–1849), and the former Baroness Charlotte Wilhelmine Schott von Schottenstein. From his parents' marriage, his younger brother was Karl Eugen von Hügel, the Foreign Minister of Württemberg from 1855 to 1864. After his mother's death in 1805, his father married Baroness Luise Ernestine von Gemmingen-Guttenberg in 1806. They had several children, including Baroness Marie von Hügel, Baron Ludwig von Hügel, Baron Julius von Hügel, and Baron Philipp von Hügel. She was a daughter of Baron Ludwig Eberhard von Gemmingen-Guttenberg and Baroness Louise Auguste von Saint-André. After Luise Ernestine died in 1834, his father married her younger sister, Baroness Elisabeth Sophie (née von Gemmingen-Guttenberg) von Cotta, widow of publisher and industrial pioneer Johann Friedrich Cotta, in 1834.

== Career ==
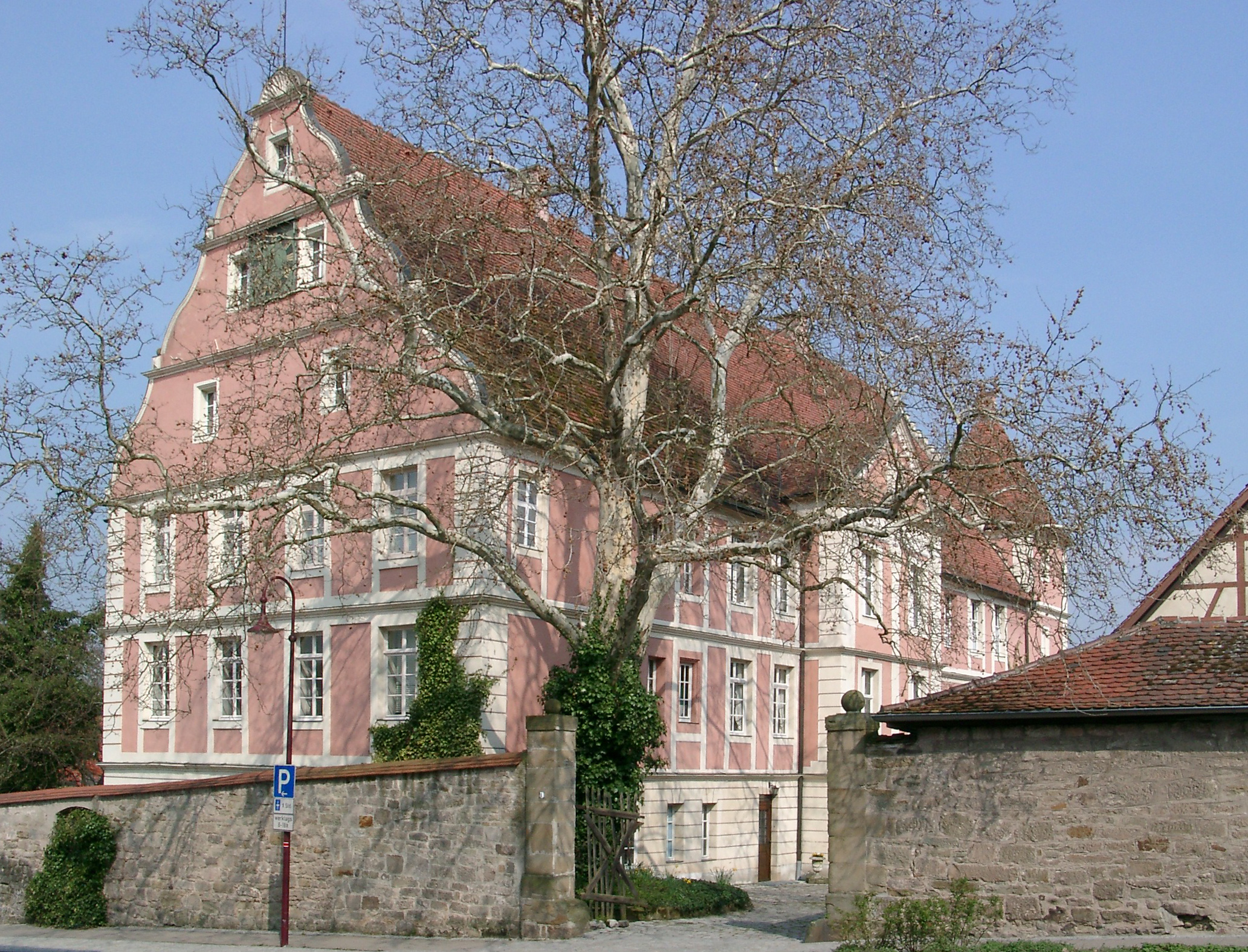
Schloss Eschenau

At the time of his marriage in 1831, Hügel was a Captain of Cavalry in the Württemberg Army, and became co-owner of the former Imperial Knight estate of Eschenau and was consequently entered in the kingdom's knightly register.

In 1851 Hügel built the manor of Waldhof in a secluded forest south east of Eschenau on the district border with Bretzfeld. In the run-up to the construction of the Kocherbahn, the railway line from Heilbronn to Hall, he is said to have exerted significant influence with his connections in Stuttgart so that the railway line ran through Eschenau, and thus the Weinsberg valley, instead of Neckarsulm and the northern Kocher valley.

In 1861 Albert von Hügel was awarded the Knight of the Order of the Württemberg Crown. At that time he was a Colonel and Commander of the 7th Infantry Regiment.

== Personal life ==
In 1831 Hügel was married to Marie Louise Elisabethe Freiin von Uexküll-Gyllenband (1811–1862), owner of the manor of Eschenau. She was a daughter of August Heinrich Friedrich von Uexküll-Gyllenband and Baroness Charlotte Maria von Gemmingen (the elder sister of his step-mothers). Before their divorce in 1843, they were the parents of three children:

- Baron Alexander Ernest August von Hügel (b. 1832)
- Baroness Anna Louise Charlotte Mathilde von Hügel (1833–1915), who married Hungarian-German Count Alfred Ferdinand Christoph von Degenfeld-Schonburg.
- Count Ernest Ludwig Paul Carl von Hügel (1835–1897), who married Princess Amalie of Teck, a daughter of Duke Alexander of Württemberg and Countess Claudine von Hohenstein. Amalie's brother was Francis, Duke of Teck, who married Princess Mary Adelaide of Cambridge (a first cousin of Queen Victoria), and was the father of Queen Mary, the consort of King George V. They lived at Schloss Reinthal near Graz and Paul was elevated to the rank of Count in 1879.

After their divorce, his wife married the Dr. Theobald Kerner) a year later. Hügel died on 31 December 1865.
