= Princess Claudine of Teck =

Austrian noble

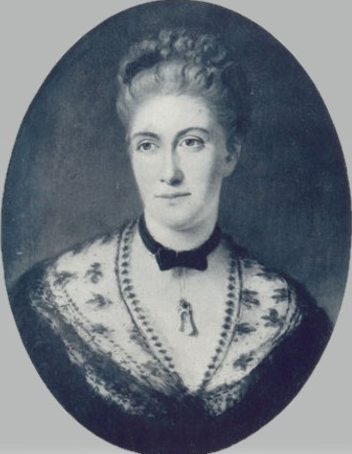
- Portrait by Sydney Hodges
- Born: Countess Claudine von Hohenstein; 11 February 1836
- Died: 18 November 1894 (aged 58); Graz, Austro-Hungarian Empire
Names
- Claudine Henriette
- House: Teck
- Father: Duke Alexander of Württemberg
- Mother: Countess Claudine Rhédey von Kis-Rhéde

Princess Claudine of Teck (Claudine Henriette, 11 February 1836 – 18 November 1894), known as Countess Claudine von Hohenstein until 1863, was a 19th-century Austrian noblewoman directly related to German and British royalty.

== Family ==
She was the first-born of the children of the morganatic marriage formed by Duke Alexander of Württemberg and Countess Claudine von Hohenstein (born Countess Claudine Rhédey von Kis-Rhéde). This marriage had a morganatic character, so that neither the wife nor the children would be considered members of the Royal House of Württemberg. She had two younger siblings, a brother and a sister:

- Francis, later Duke of Teck (1837–1900), married to Princess Mary Adelaide of Cambridge
- Countess Amalie of Hohenstein (1838–1893), married to Count Paul von Hügel

Her father was an officer in the army of the Austrian Empire and her mother belonged to the Hungarian nobility. For this reason the marriage was established in Vienna. Her mother was awarded the title of Countess of Hohenstein by Ferdinand I of Austria on 16 May 1835, fourteen days after their wedding.

== Biography ==
Her childhood and early youth were spent in Vienna with her parents and siblings. Her mother died in 1841, as a result of an accident in which she was run over by horses. Her sister Amelia's marriage to Baron (later Count) Paul von Hügel and their transfer to Reinthal castle near Graz, led her to take up residence in a Swiss-style chalet a short distance from her sister.

On 1 December 1863, her father’s cousin King William I of Württemberg granted Claudine and her brother Francis the title and rank of princes (fürst) of Teck, with the style of Serene Highness.

Claudine had a great fondness for gardening and farming. In her residence she had a farm. Her life was spent with her sister's family (her husband and their only child, Paul Julius von Hügel, known as Bubi). They alternated local life with occasional family visits such as those of the family of her brother Francis and his wife Mary Adelaide and their children, among whom was Princess Mary, future queen consort of the United Kingdom. In the autumn of 1869 she visited the United Kingdom invited by her brother Francis and sister-in-law. The visit lasted until the new year (1870) and included a short stay in Windsor Castle summoned by Queen Victoria.

She died of diphtheria on 18 November 1894, fourteen months after the death of her sister Amelia in 1893. Previously, on 10 November 1893, she had made a will.

== Titles and styles ==
- 28 August 1837 – 1 December 1863: Countess Claudine of Hohenstein.
- 1 December 1863 – 18 November 1894: Her Serene Highness Princess Claudine of Teck.

== Sources ==
- Baring-Gould, Sabine (1911). "Chapter XII. On the pedigree of Her Gracious Majesty the Queen". The land of Teck and its neighbourhood. London, New York: John Lane The Bodley Head. pp. 260–307.
- Pope-Hennesy, James (1959). "Book I. Princess May. 4. Rumpenheim, Neustrelitz and Reinthal. VI.". Queen Mary. London: George Allen and Unwin, Ltd. pp. 105–111.
