= Princess Amalie of Teck =

Austrian noblewoman (1838–1893)

- Countess Paul von Hügel
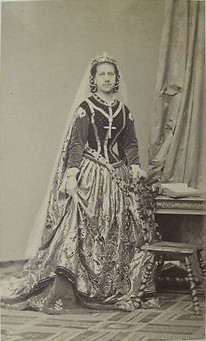
- Portrait in medieval costume, c. 1862
- Born: Countess Amalie von Hohenstein; 12 November 1838
- Died: 20 July 1893 (aged 54); Graz, Austro-Hungarian Empire
- Burial: Cemetery of Saint Peter, Graz, Austria
- Spouse: Count Paul von Hügel (m. 1863)
- Issue: Count Paul Julius von Hügel
Names
- Amalie Josephine Henriette Agnes Sussane
- House: Teck (by birth); Hügel (by marriage)
- Father: Duke Alexander of Württemberg
- Mother: Countess Claudine Rhédey von Kis-Rhéde

Princess Amalia of Teck (Amalie Josephine Henriette Agnes Sussane, 12 November 1838 – 20 July 1893), known as Countess Amalie of Hohenstein until 1863, was an Austrian noblewoman closely related to the royal houses of Württemberg and the United Kingdom.

== Early life ==
She was the third and last of the children of the marriage formed by Duke Alexander of Württemberg and Countess Claudine von Hohenstein (born Countess Rhédey de Kis-Rhéde). As the latter did not belong to any reigning or mediatised house, the marriage was declared morganatic and her mother was granted the title of Countess of Hohenstein by Emperor Ferdinand I of Austria. This last title was the one that both Amalie and her siblings carried from their birth. Her siblings were Countess Claudine of Hohenstein, later Princess of Teck, and Count Francis of Hohenstein (later Prince of Teck and Duke of Teck), who was married to Princess Mary Adelaide of Cambridge.

She was orphaned in 1841 after her mother died as a result of a horseback riding accident. She spent her childhood and youth in Vienna with her father and siblings.

== Personal life ==
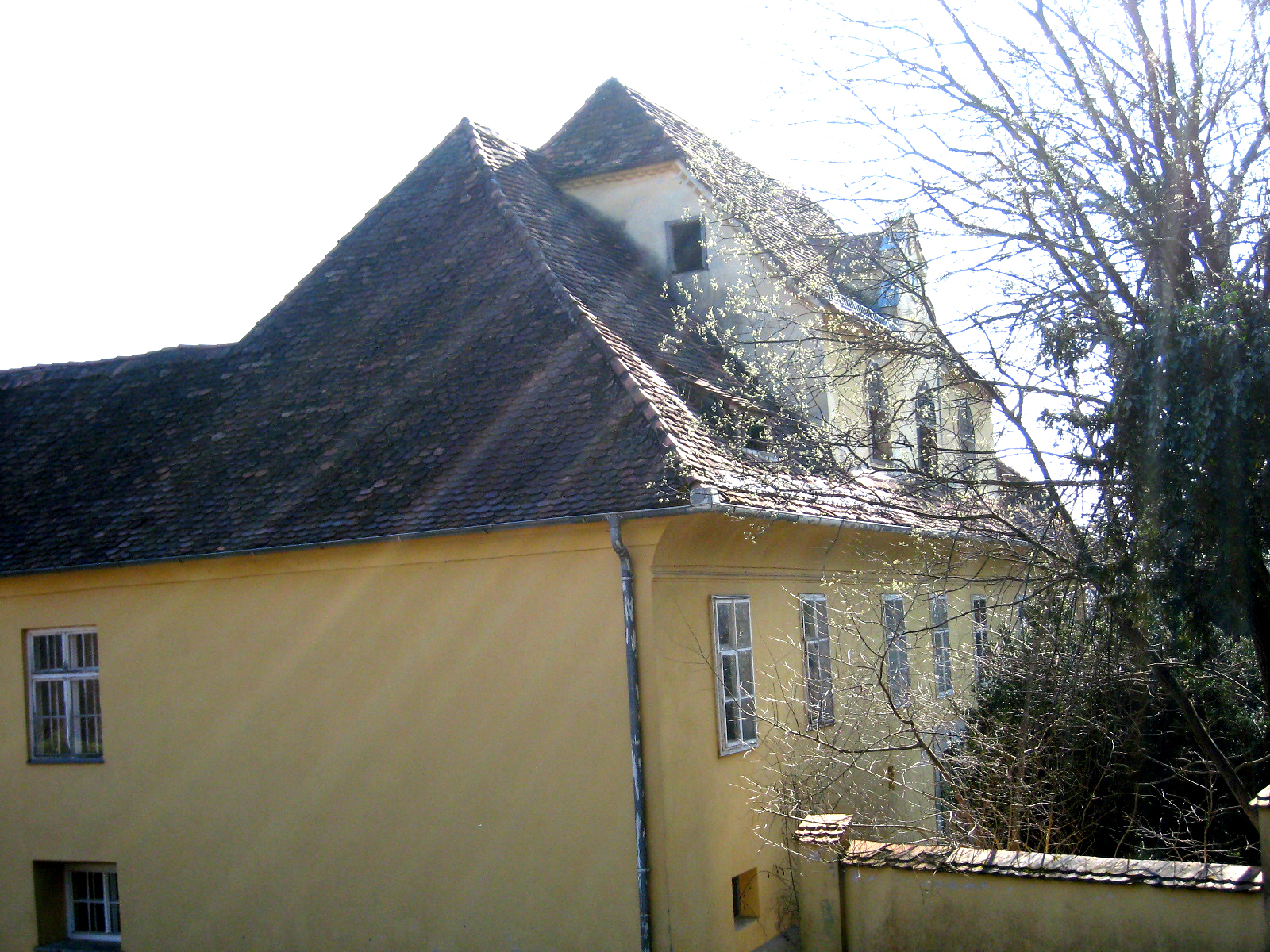
Amalie's residence: Schloss Reinthal, Graz

On 13 October 1863, she married Count Ernst Ludwig Paul Carl von Hügel (13 April 1835 – 13 April 1897), an Austrian officer who was the son of Baron Albert von Hügel and grandson of Baron Ernst von Hügel. After the wedding, they moved to Reinthal Castle, near Graz, owned by her husband's family. Her sister Claudine moved into a Swiss-style chalet near the castle. She had a quiet and provincial life with her family with occasional visits from her brother Francis and his wife Mary Adelaide, as well as his children, among whom was Mary of Teck, future queen consort of the United Kingdom from her marriage to George V. Together, they were the parents of:

- Count Paul Julius von Hügel (30 September 1872 – 20 March 1912), who married Anna Pauline Homolatsch in 1896. They had two children:
  - Countess Huberta Amelia Maximiliane Pauline von Hügel (8 October 1897 – 22 December 1912)
  - Count Ferdinand von Hügel (11 March 1901 – 1939)

On 16 December 1871, her cousin Charles I of Württemberg raised her to princess of Teck, just as his father, William I of Württemberg, had done with her siblings on 1 December 1863.

She died on 20 July 1893 as a result of cancer. She was buried in the cemetery of St. Peter in Graz.

== Titles and styles ==
- 28 August 1837 – 13 October 1863 : Countess Amalie of Hohenstein
- 13 October 1863 – 16 December 1871: Countess Amalie of Hohenstein, Baroness von Hügel
- 16 December 1871 – 13 June 1879: Her Serene Highness Princess Amalie of Teck, Baroness von Hügel
- 13 June 1879 – 20 July 1893: Her Serene Highness Princess Amalie of Teck, Countess von Hügel

== Sources ==
- Baring-Gould, Sabine (1911). "Chapter XII. On the pedigree of Her Gracious Majesty the Queen". The land of Teck and its neighbourhood. London, New York: John Lane The Bodley Head. pp. 260–307.
- Pope-Hennesy, James (1959). "Book I. Princess May. 4. Rumpenheim, Neustrelitz and Reinthal. VI.". Queen Mary. London: George Allen and Unwin, Ltd. pp. 105–111.
