= Sângeorgiu de Pădure =

Sângeorgiu de Pădure Erdőszentgyörgy
- Town
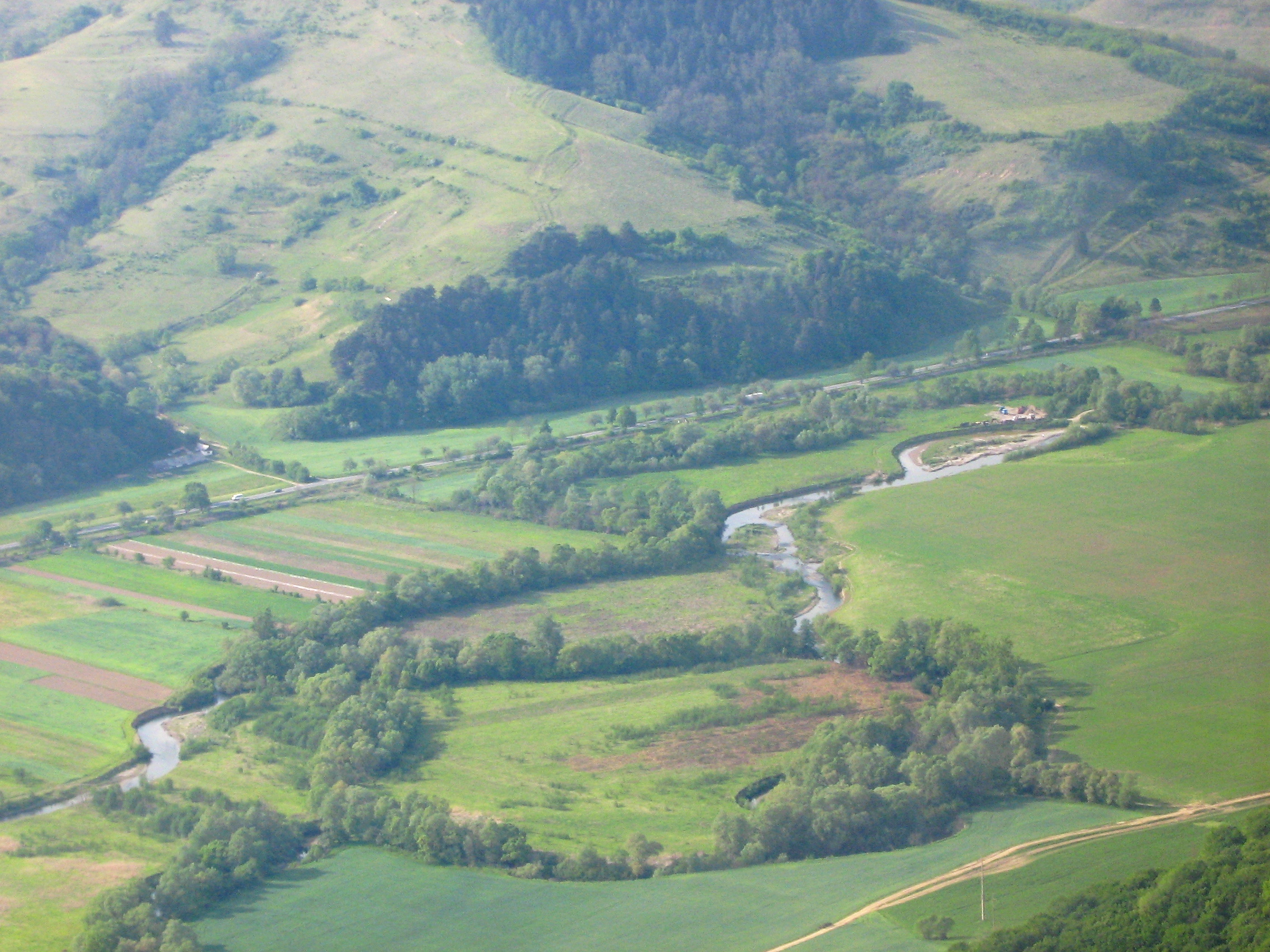
- Landscape near the town

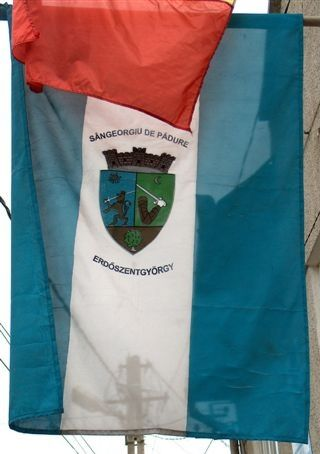
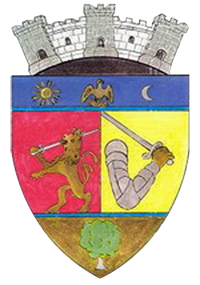
- Flag Coat of arms

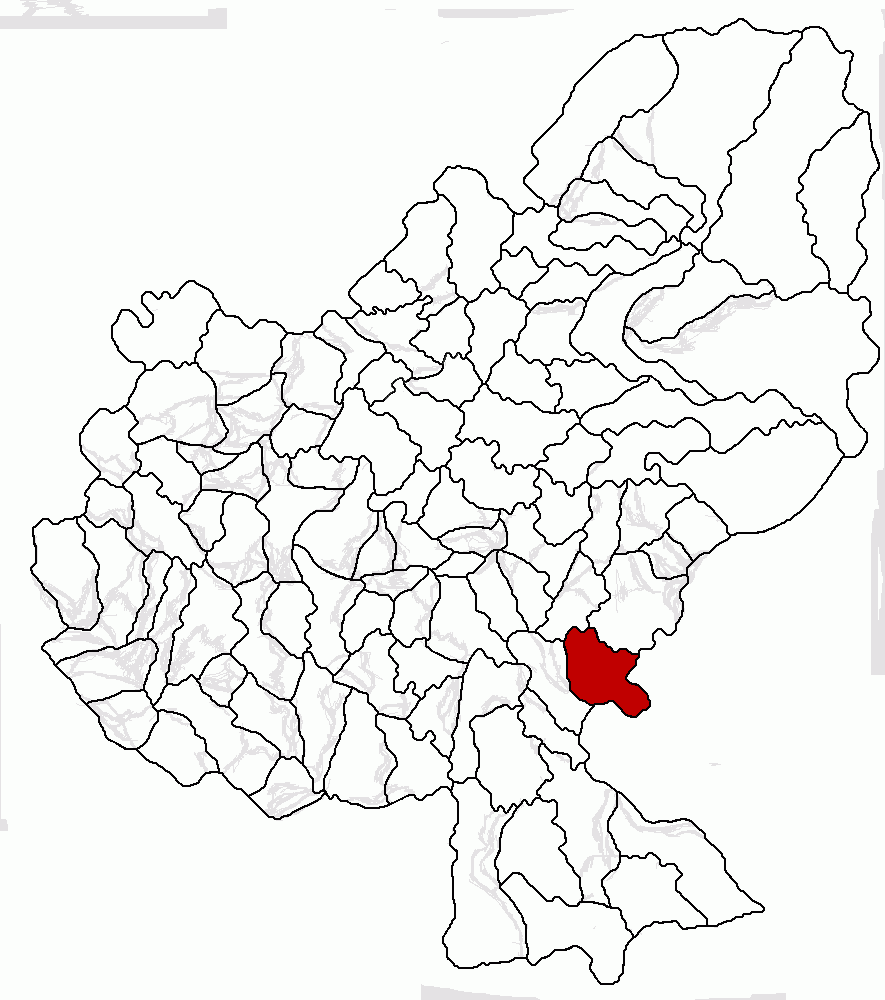
- Location in Mureș County

- Location in Romania
- Coordinates: 46°25′49″N 24°50′30″E
- Country: Romania
- County: Mureș

Government
  - Mayor (2024–2028): Levente-Loránd Szász (UDMR)
- Area: 71.42 km^{2} (27.58 sq mi)
- Elevation: 350 m (1,150 ft)
- Population (2021-12-01): 4,875
  - Density: 68.26/km^{2} (176.8/sq mi)
- Time zone: UTC+02:00 (EET)
  - Summer (DST): UTC+03:00 (EEST)
- Postal code: 547535
- Area code: +40 265
- Vehicle reg.: MS
- Website: sgpadure.ro

Sângeorgiu de Pădure (English (lit.): Saint George on the Heath, Hungarian: Erdőszentgyörgy [ˈɛrdøːsɛɲɟørɟ]; German: Sankt Georgen auf der Heide) is a town in Mureș County, Transylvania, Romania. Bezid (Bözöd), Bezidu Nou (Bözödújfalu), and Loțu (Lóc) villages are administratively part of the town.

== History ==
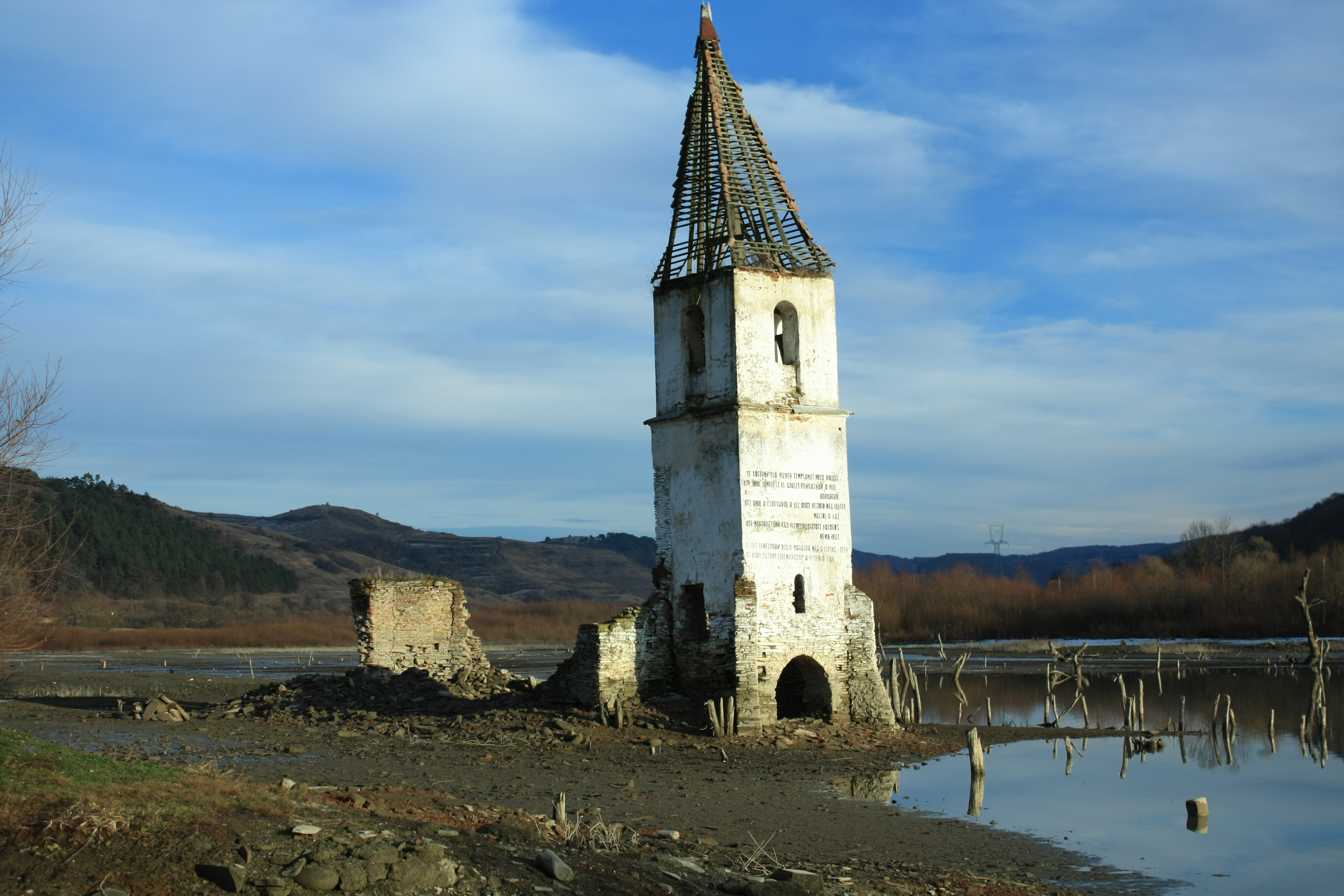
The church of the flooded Bezidu Nou (Bözödújfalu) village

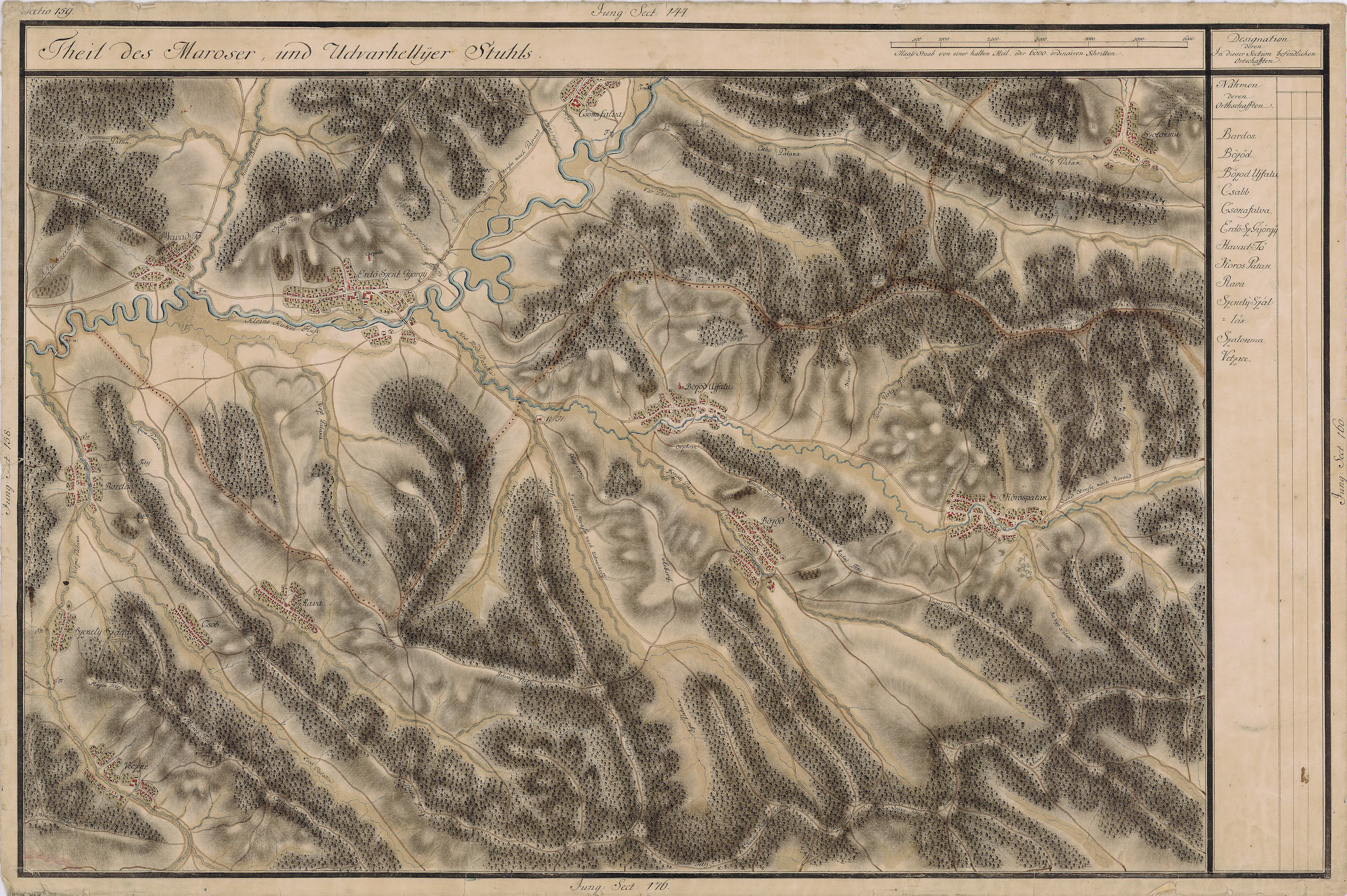
As Erdő Szent Györgÿ on Josephine Land survey, 18th century

The first written record of the town is preserved in a papal tithe applotment list from 1333 in which mention is made of a priest, "de Sancto Georgio," who paid a sum of 6 dinars to the neighboring diocese. In 1347, a man named Erdő, count of the Székelys, and the sons of Erdő of Erdőszentgyörgy were mentioned. In 1442, Anna Herepei, wife of Erdő of Erdewzenthgergh is written about. The village was the estate of Francis I Rákóczi, prince of Transylvania. The Rédey castle was built in 1647. In 1788, Péter Bodor was born here. In 1818–1809, the Rédey castle was rebuilt. In 1913, the official Hungarian name of the village was Erdőszentgyörgy.

Its Romanian name was originally Erdeo-Sângeorgiu; in 1919 the name changed to Sîngeorgiul de Pădure, which later was changed by Romanian authorities to the current official name.

In the mid-1780s, as part of the Josephine administrative reform, Marosszék was integrated into Küküllő County, however, the szék-system was restored in 1790. After the suppression of the Hungarian Revolution in 1849, the village formed part of the Kibéd military sub-division of the Marosvásárhely division in the Udvarhely military district. Between 1861 and 1876, the former Marosszék was restored. As a result of the administrative reform in 1876, the village fell within Nyárádszereda district of Maros-Torda County in the Kingdom of Hungary.

In the immediate aftermath of World War I, following the declaration of the Union of Transylvania with Romania, the area passed under Romanian administration during the Hungarian–Romanian War of 1918–1919. By the terms of the Treaty of Trianon of 1920, Sângeorgiu de Pădure became part of the Kingdom of Romania. During the interwar period, the commune became the headquarters of Plasa Sângeorgiu de Pădure of Odorhei County. In August 1940, the Second Vienna Award granted Northern Transylvania to Hungary and the territory was held by Hungary until October 1944, when it was taken back from Hungarian and German troops by Romanian and Soviet forces. Administered by the Soviet authorities after 12 November 1944, the village, together with the rest of Northern Transylvania, came under Romanian administration on 13 March 1945.

In 1950, after Communist Romania was established, Sângeorgiu de Pădure became part of the Odorhei Raion of Stalin Region. Between 1952 and 1960, the commune fell within the Magyar Autonomous Region, and between 1960 and 1968, the Mureș-Magyar Autonomous Region. In 1968, the region was abolished, and since then, the settlement has been part of Mureș County. It became a town in 2004.

The grave of Claudia Rhédey, grandmother of Mary of Teck, is placed in the crypt of the Reformed church, which was renovated in 1936 from a donation on behalf of Queen Mary of Teck (great-granddaughter of count Rhédey and grandmother of Queen Elisabeth II) and the British royal family.

== Demographics ==
Historical population
Year	Pop.	±%
1850	3,354	—
1880	3,882	+15.7%
1900	4,277	+10.2%
1910	4,528	+5.9%
1930	4,829	+6.6%
1956	6,360	+31.7%
1977	5,714	−10.2%
1992	5,715	+0.0%
2002	5,492	−3.9%
2011	5,055	−8.0%
2021	4,875	−3.6%
Source: Census data

Sângeorgiu de Pădure has an absolute Székely Hungarian majority. In 1900, the village had, in order of population size, 4,131 Hungarian (91,23%) and 352 Romanian (7.77%) inhabitants. In 1930, the census indicated 2,954 Hungarians (61.17%), 1,194 Romanians (24.73%), 334 Jews (6.92%), and 334 Gypsies (6.92%).

The 2002 Census counted 5,492 inhabitants, Calvinism being professed by 54.71% of the total population, while 19.61% of the respondents belonged to the Romanian Orthodox Church, 10.34% of the respondents identified themselves as Unitarian, 8.55% as Roman Catholic, and 1.07% as Baptist.

According to the 2011 census, the town had a population of 5,055, of which 3,816 (75,48%) were Hungarians, while 904 were Romanians (17.88%), and 4.74% Roma. In 2002, 2,121 households were registered in the town along with 1,912 residential buildings.

At the 2021 census, Sângeorgiu de Pădure had a population of 4,875; of those, 74.38% were Hungarians, 14.99% Romanians, and 2.81% Roma.

== Politics ==
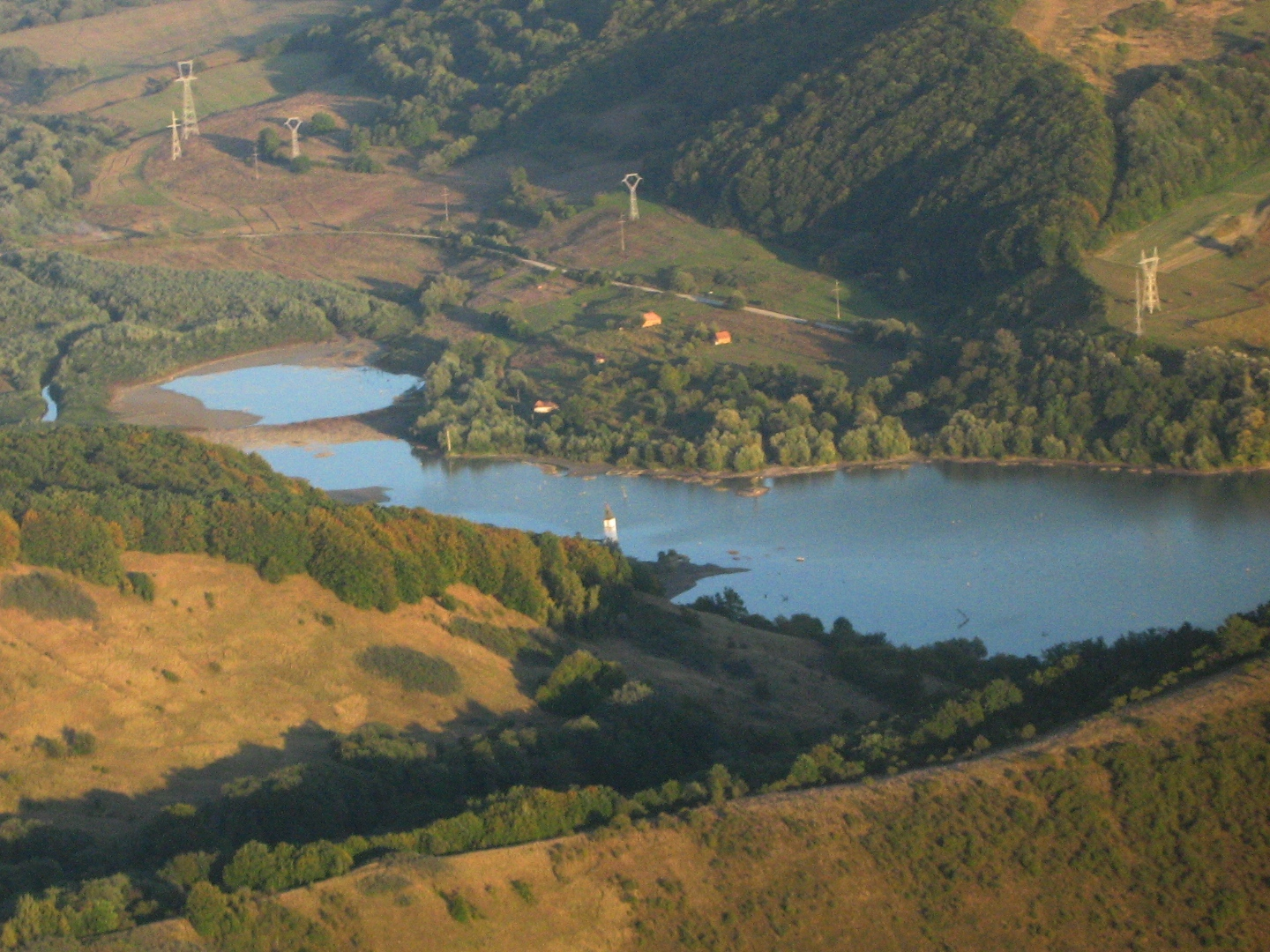
The Bezid (Bözöd) artificial lake

The local Town Council has 15 members:

Party	Number of councillors
Democratic Union of Hungarians in Romania	9
Social Liberal Union	5
Hungarian Civic Party	1

== Landmarks ==
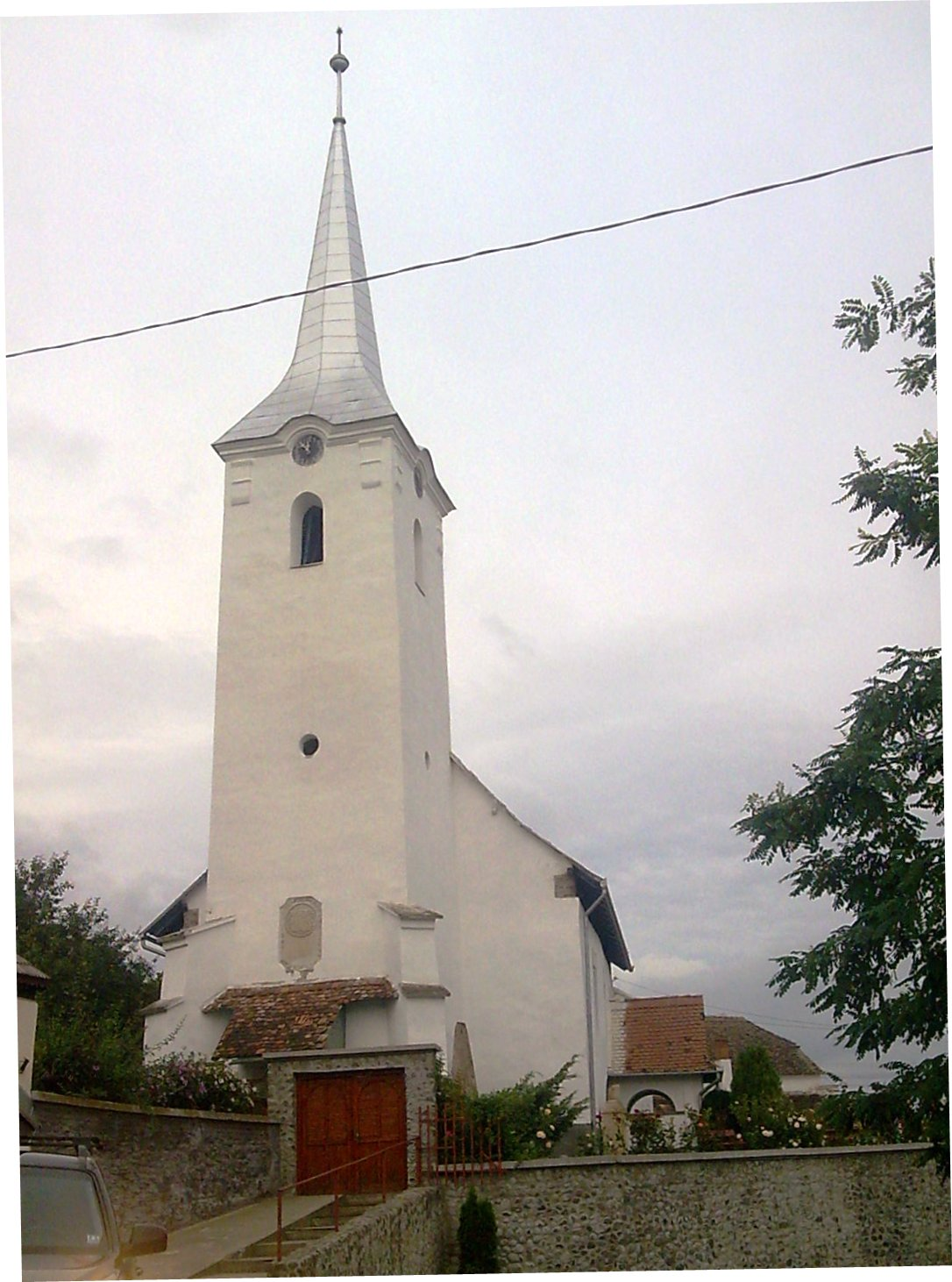
The Reformed church

- The Rhédey Castle was built in 1759 on the site of a former 16th-century castle. The castle was rebuilt in 1808. This is where Countess Claudine Rhédey von Kis-Rhéde grew up.
- The reformed church was built in the late 13th and early 14th centuries. The synode of the Unitarian church was held here in 1621 whern the Unitarians officially distanced themselves from the Sabbatarians as 'Judaizers'. It has belonged to the Reformed church since 1640. The church tower was added during the era of the Reformation. The patrons of the church were the Rhédey and Wesselényi families. It was rebuilt and restored in 1760. During a plague, the crypt below the church was closed by a wall by order of Gabriel Bethlen, prince of Transylvania. The crypt of the Rhédey family is also in this church. The Rhédey Mausoleum, now in ruins, stands on top of a hill north of the village. This is where the remains of countess Claudia Rhédey, wife of Duke Alexander of Württemberg were removed in 1841 and moved into the Reformed church.
- The Orthodox church was built in 1838 in the place of a former wooden church.
- The town has a synagogue, too.
- The mansion house of the Zeyk family is from the 16th century. Lieutenant General János Kiss was born in this house.

== Notable people ==
- Péter Bodor, Székely mechanic, was born here in 1788
- György Bözödi (1913–1989), writer, sociologist, and historian
- Countess Claudine Rhédey von Kis-Rhéde, morganatic wife of Duke Alexander of Württemberg. She is the great-great-great grandmother of King Charles III of the United Kingdom
- Lieutenant General János Kiss, martyr of Hungarian anti-German resistance movement, was born here in 1883.
- András Némethi (born 1959), mathematician
- Ecaterina Oancia (1954–2024), rowing cox

== Economy ==
The Sângeorgiu de Pădure gas field is situated on the administrative territory of the town. The gas field was discovered in 1920 and began production in 1925. It is currently operated by Romgaz.

== Twinnings ==
The town is twinned with:

- Baja, Hungary (since 2002)
- Bélapátfalva, Hungary (since 2006)
- Celldömölk, Hungary (since 2001)
- Inke, Hungary (since 2011)
- Kovačica, Serbia (since 2007)
- Plan-les-Ouates, Switzerland (since 2002)
- Varades, France (since 2000)

== See also ==
- List of Hungarian exonyms (Mureș County)
