= Duke of Teck =

Noble title

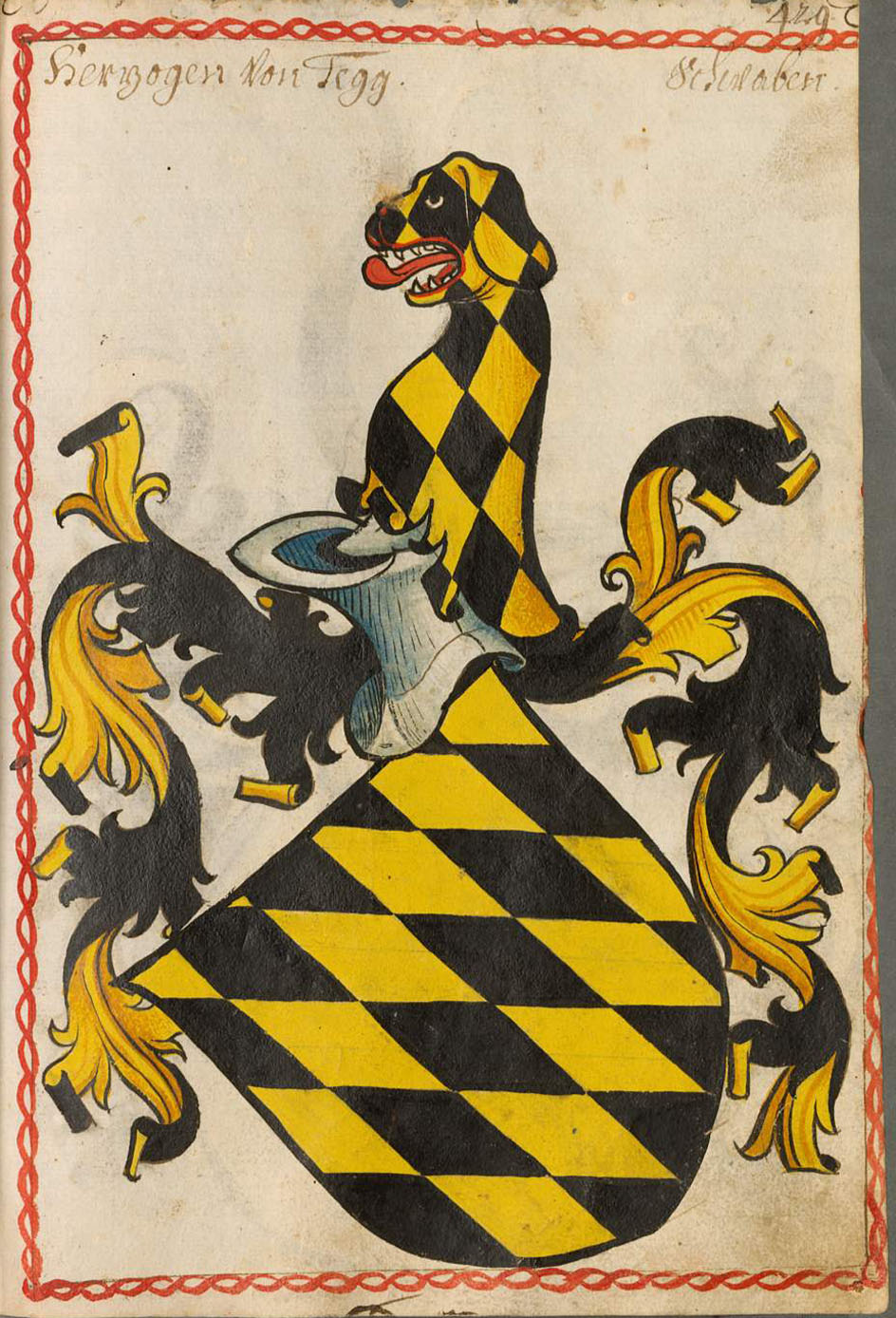
Coat of arms of the Dukes of Teck, Scheiblersches Wappenbuch, 1450–80

Duke of Teck (German: Herzog von Teck) is a title which was created twice in Germanic lands. It was first borne from 1187 to 1439 by the head of a cadet line of the German ducal House of Zähringen, known as the "first House of Teck". The seat of this territory was Teck Castle in the Duchy of Swabia (from 1512 part of the County of Württemberg).

The title was recreated in 1871 by King Charles I of Württemberg for his cousin Francis, who as the product of a morganatic marriage did not have a right to titles of nobility as a member of the House of Württemberg. His descendants settled in the United Kingdom and married into the British royal family.

== The first House of Teck ==
Adalbert I, son of Conrad I, Duke of Zähringen, inherited his father's Swabian possessions around Teck Castle between Kirchheim and Owen. After the death of his brother Berthold IV in 1186, Adalbert adopted the title of "Duke of Teck". His descendant, Conrad II, became a candidate for the election as king of the Romans upon the death of King Rudolf I in 1291, but was slain the following year, probably by agents of his opponent Siegfried of Westerburg, Archbishop of Cologne.

In the 13th century, the family divided into the lines of Teck-Oberndorf and Teck-Owen. The dukes of Teck-Oberndorf died out in 1363 and Frederick of Teck-Owen sold their possessions to the counts of Hohenberg. In 1365, the dukes of Teck-Owen came into the possession of Mindelheim but had to sell their lands around Castle Teck to the counts of Württemberg in 1381. The last member of that line, Louis of Teck, Patriarch of Aquileia from 1412, died in 1439.

In 1495, Holy Roman Emperor Maximilian I elevated Count Eberhard von Württemberg to the status of reigning duke (herzog) of Württemberg, also granting him the defunct title of "Duke of Teck". However, the title was not borne independently by any member or branch of that dynasty. Eventually, in 1806, the dignity was renounced by Frederick upon his elevation as king.

== The Teck branch of the Württembergs ==
Arms of Francis, Duke of Teck

Duke Alexander of Württemberg (1804–1885), an Austrian major-general and cadet of the dynasty that had become kings of Württemberg in 1806, established a non-dynastic line of dukes of Teck by virtue of his morganatic marriage in 1835 with a Hungarian noblewoman, Countess Claudine Rhédey von Kis-Rhéde (1812–1841). Their son, excluded from succession to the throne of Württemberg, was born Count Francis von Hohenstein (1837–1900), sharing the title his mother was granted by Emperor Ferdinand I of Austria on 16 May 1835, two weeks after the couple married in Vienna.

In 1863, King William I of Württemberg raised Francis in rank to "Prince (Fürst) of Teck" with the style Serene Highness (Durchlaucht), heritable by all his male-line descendants. In 1866, Francis married Princess Mary Adelaide of Cambridge, a member of the British royal family and granddaughter of King George III. As the couple had to live on Mary's parliamentary annuity, the prince having inherited little income, they lived mostly in England—first at Kensington Palace (where their children were born) and later at Royal Lodge in Surrey, both residences lent them by Queen Victoria.

In 1871, King Charles I of Württemberg granted Francis the new (and, within the German nobility, higher) title of "Duke (Herzog) of Teck", heritable by male-line primogeniture. In 1887, Queen Victoria granted the Duke of Teck the British style of Highness on a non-hereditary basis.

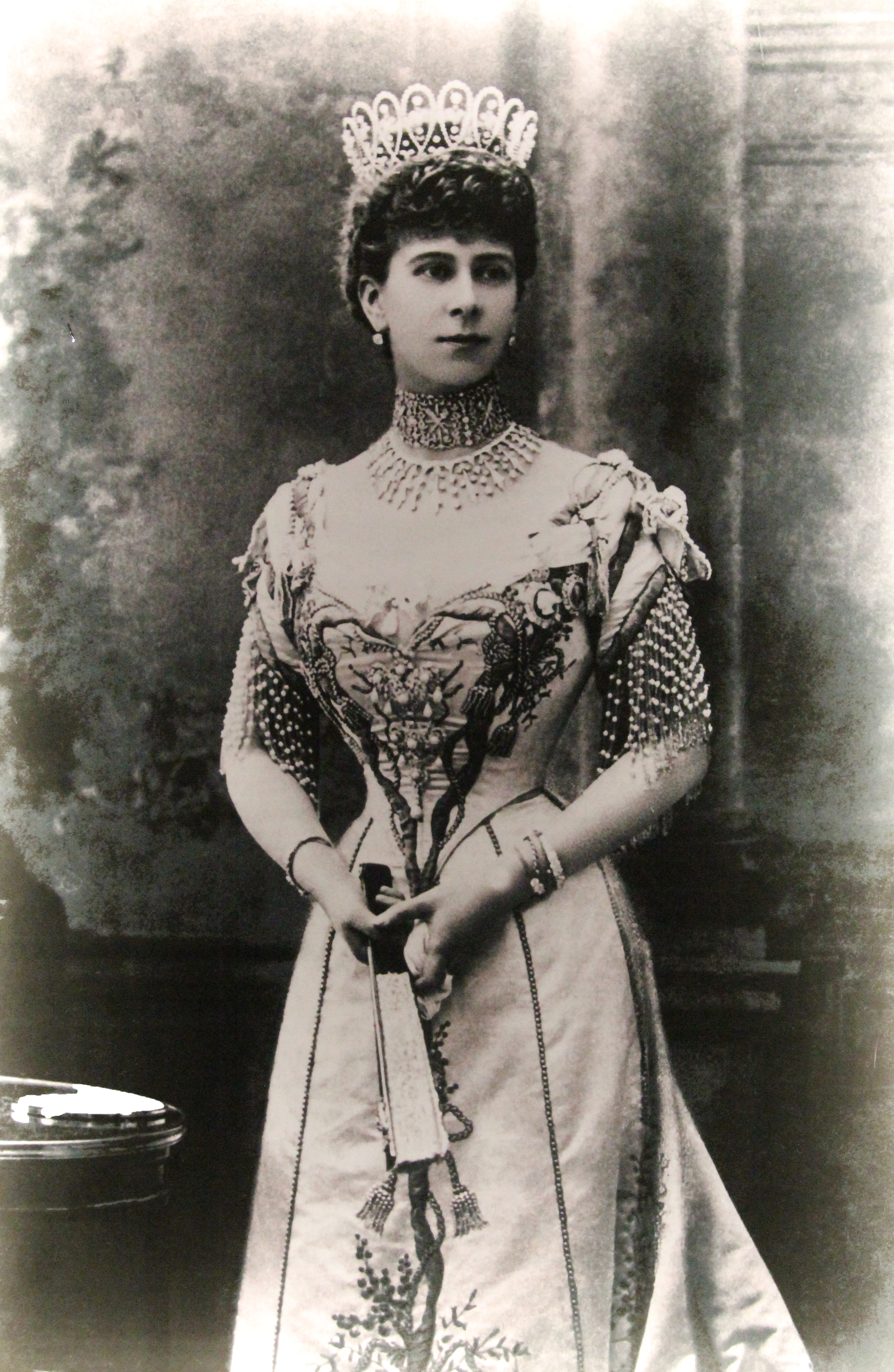
Princess Victoria Mary

In 1893, Francis' daughter, Princess Victoria Mary of Teck, married Prince George, Duke of York, who later reigned as King George V. When the first duke of Teck died in 1900, the title passed to his eldest son, Prince Adolphus of Teck. King George V granted the second duke of Teck, his brother-in-law, the personal style of Highness in 1911.

The title existed until the First World War, when anti-German sentiment in the United Kingdom prompted the British monarch to adopt a non-German surname and relinquish all German titles on behalf of himself and those of his family members domiciled in his realms, including the Tecks. The Duke of Teck thus renounced, in July 1917, his German titles of prince and duke in the Kingdom of Württemberg, as well as the styles of Highness and Serene Highness. Adolphus, along with his brother, Prince Alexander of Teck, assumed the name "Cambridge", which had been borne as a territorial designation by their maternal grandfather, Prince Adolphus, Duke of Cambridge.

On 16 July 1917, Adolphus was created "Marquess of Cambridge", "Earl of Eltham" and "Viscount Northallerton" in the Peerage of the United Kingdom. His elder son took the courtesy title of "Earl of Eltham". His younger children became "Lord/Lady (Christian name) Cambridge", as children of a marquess. Adolphus's younger brother, Alexander, who had married Princess Alice of Albany in 1904, was simultaneously created "Earl of Athlone" and "Viscount Trematon". Their son Prince Rupert of Teck (1907–1928), who also took the surname of Cambridge and was known by the courtesy title of "Viscount Trematon", was one of the descendants of Queen Victoria who suffered from haemophilia, along with the crown princes Alexei of Russia and Alfonso of Spain.

The last male-line descendant of the first duke of Teck was his grandson George Cambridge, 2nd Marquess of Cambridge. He died in 1981 and the marquessate of Cambridge became extinct.

=== Members ===
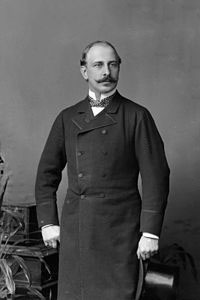
Francis, Duke of Teck

- Princess Claudine of Teck (1836–1894)
- Prince Francis, Duke of Teck (1837–1900) m. Princess Mary Adelaide of Cambridge
  - Princess Victoria Mary of Teck (1867–1953) m. King George V of the United Kingdom
  - Prince Adolphus, Duke of Teck, later Adolphus Cambridge, 1st Marquess of Cambridge (1868–1927) m. Lady Margaret Grosvenor
    - Prince George of Teck, later George Cambridge, 2nd Marquess of Cambridge (1895–1981) m. Dorothy Hastings
      - Lady Mary Cambridge (1924–1999) m. Peter Whitley
    - Princess Mary of Teck, later Lady Mary Cambridge (1897–1987) m. Henry Somerset, 10th Duke of Beaufort
    - Princess Helena of Teck, later Lady Helena Cambridge (1899–1969) m. Colonel John Evelyn Gibbs
    - Prince Frederick of Teck, later Lord Frederick Cambridge (1907–1940)
  - Prince Francis of Teck (1870–1910)
  - Prince Alexander of Teck, later Alexander Cambridge, 1st Earl of Athlone (1874–1957) m. Princess Alice of Albany
    - Princess May of Teck, later Lady May Cambridge (1906–1994) m. Sir Henry Abel Smith
    - Prince Rupert of Teck, later Rupert Cambridge, Viscount Trematon (1907–1928)
    - Prince Maurice of Teck (1910–1910)
- Princess Amalie of Teck (1838–1893) m. Count Paul von Hügel (1835–1897)

== See also ==
- Coat of arms of Württemberg
