= Countess Claudine Rhédey de Kis-Rhéde =

Austrian countess

Claudine Rhédey de Kis-Rhéde
- Countess von Hohenstein
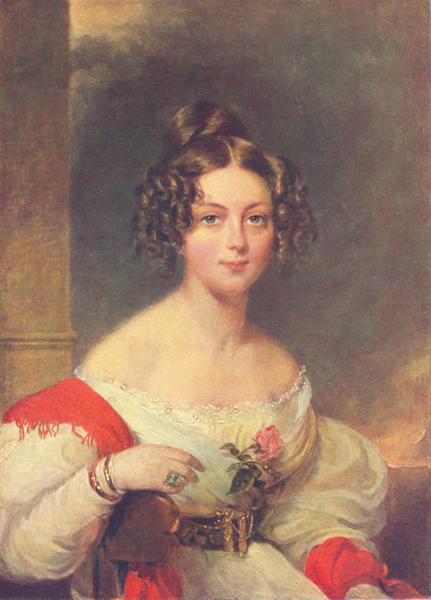
- Born: 21 September 1812; Sankt Georgen auf der Heide, Kingdom of Hungary (now Sângeorgiu de Pădure, Romania)
- Died: 1 October 1841 (aged 29); Pettau, Austrian Empire (now Ptuj, Slovenia)
- Spouse: Duke Alexander of Württemberg (m. 1835)
- Issue: Princess Claudine; Francis, Duke of Teck; Amelie, Countess Paul von Hügel
Names
- German: Claudine Susanna Rhédey von Kis-Rhéde; Hungarian: kisrédei Rhédey Klaudia Zsuzsanna
- House: Württemberg (by marriage)
- Father: Count László Rhédey de Kis-Rhéde
- Mother: Baroness Ágnes Inczédy de Nagy-Várad

Countess Claudine Susanna Rhédey de Kis-Rhéde (Hungarian: Gróf kisrédei Rhédey Klaudina Zsuzsanna; 21 September 1812 – 1 October 1841) was the Hungarian wife of Duke Alexander of Württemberg. Her son, Francis, Duke of Teck, was the father of Mary of Teck, queen consort to George V of the United Kingdom. The current British monarch, Charles III, is Claudine's great-great-great-grandson.

== Life ==
The Countess was born on her family estate, Rhédey castle, in Sankt Georgen auf der Heide (Hungarian: Erdőszentgyörgy), Transylvania (then part of the Austrian Empire, today Sângeorgiu de Pădure, Romania) to Count László Rhédey de Kis-Rhéde and his wife, Baroness Ágnes Inczédy de Nagy-Várad. The most notable member of her family was Ferenc Rhédey, the reigning Prince of Transylvania who ruled the Principality of Transylvania between 1657 and 1658. At birth, she was styled as Countess Klaudina (Claudine) Rhédey de Kis-Rhéde.

In 1835, she married Duke Alexander of Württemberg, youngest child and the only son of Duke Louis of Württemberg (younger brother of King Frederick I of Württemberg) and his wife, Princess Henriette of Nassau-Weilburg. Due to the German laws relating to the line of succession, she was viewed as being of non-royal rank and the marriage was declared morganatic. She was denied the title of Duchess, but was created Countess von Hohenstein by Ferdinand I of Austria on 16 May 1835, shortly after her marriage.

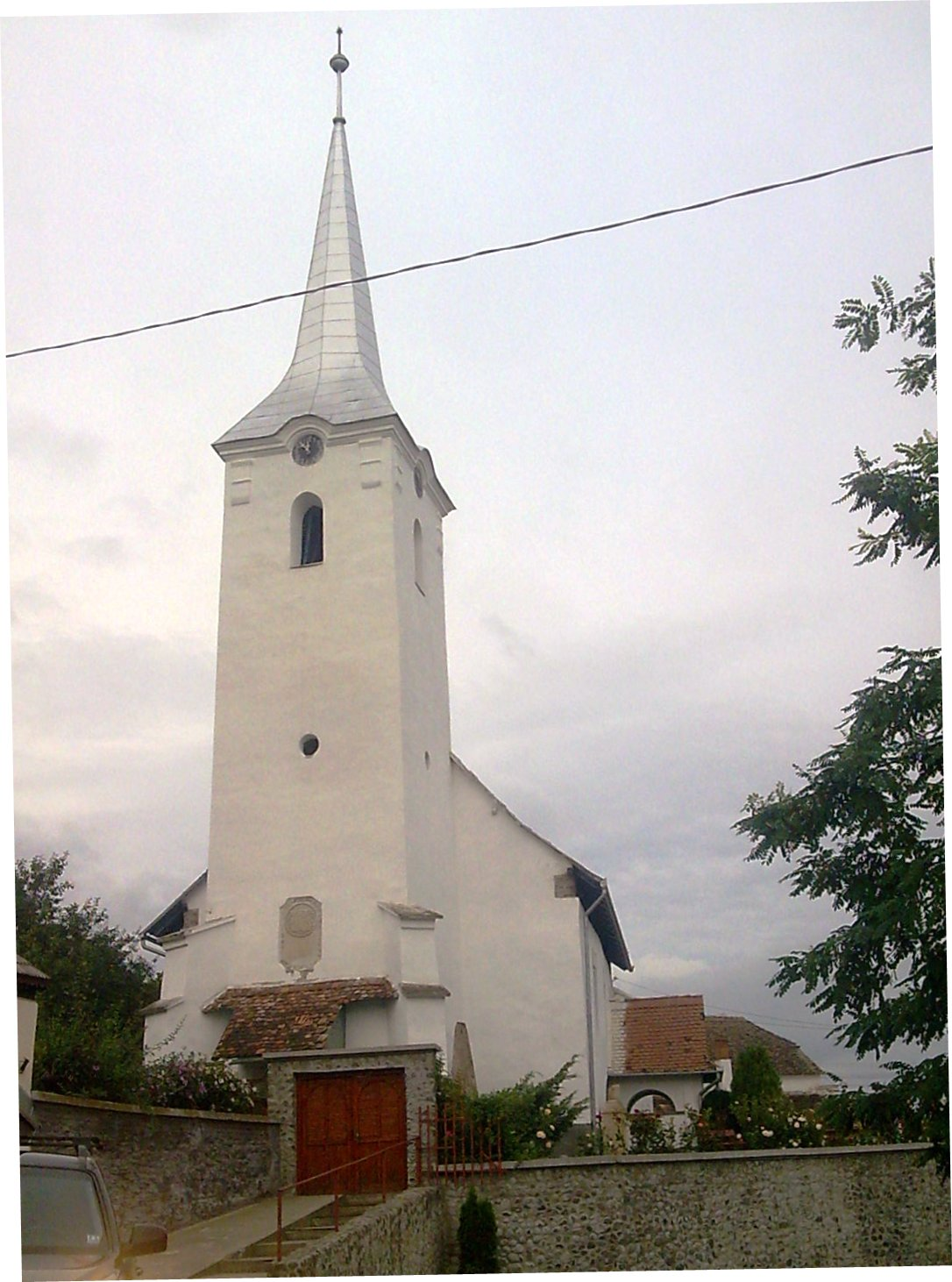
The crypt of the Rhédey family is in the Reformed Church of Sângeorgiu de Pădure in present-day Romania.

Claudine died in Austria in 1841 after being thrown from her horse. The remains of the Countess were originally interred in the Rhédey Mausoleum, but were subsequently removed and placed in the family crypt in the Reformed Church of Sângeorgiu de Pădure.

== Issue ==
Countess Claudine Rhédey de Kis-Rhéde and Countess von Hohenstein had three children with Duke Alexander of Württemberg:

- Princess Claudine of Teck (1836–1894).
- Prince Francis of Teck (1837–1900); later created 1st Duke of Teck by Charles I of Württemberg; married, on 12 June 1866 at St. Anne's Church, Kew, Surrey, West London, Princess Mary Adelaide of Cambridge, and had issue. He was granted the style of Highness by Queen Victoria on 1 July 1887, as a gift to celebrate her Golden Jubilee.
- Princess Amalie of Teck (1838–1893); married, on 24 October 1863 Baron (later Count) Paul von Hügel (1835–1897). They lived in Castle Reinthal, near Graz.

All children were initially styled as Counts or Countesses von Hohenstein, taking their titles from their mother. However, in 1863, the children were created Princes and Princesses of Teck by William I of Württemberg, with the style Serene Highness in the Kingdom of Württemberg.

== Descendants ==
Prince Francis of Teck was later created Duke of Teck. He married Princess Mary Adelaide of Cambridge, a granddaughter of George III and became a member of the British royal family. His only daughter, Mary of Teck, married Prince George, Duke of York in July 1893, becoming queen consort on her husband's accession to the throne in May 1910. The current British monarch, Charles III, is Mary's great-grandson and thus Claudine's great-great-great-grandson.

== Ancestors ==
The Rhédey family has been known from the 13th century. It is one of many Hungarian noble families descending from the House of Aba. The most notable ancestor of the Aba noble house was Samuel Aba, the third king of Hungary between 1041 and 1044, married to a sister of St. Stephen I, the first Roman Catholic (or Eastern Orthodox depending on view from the Great Schism of 1054) king of Hungary.

On her mother's side, Claudine is a descendant of Vlad the Monk and his brother, the infamous Vlad Dracula the inspiration for the character Count Dracula. On her father's side, Claudine is a descendant of Jovan Branković.

== See also ==
- Mary of Teck
- Aba (family)
- Family tree of the British royal family
