= Margot von Beroldingen =

American heiress (1878–1968)

Margot Marie Norris (née Stone, formerly Countess von Beroldingen) (14 October 1878 – 1968) was an American heiress who married an Austrian aristocrat.

== Early life ==
Margot Marie Stone was born in Paris, France on 14 October 1878. She was the youngest of three daughters of Joseph Foulke Stone (1840–1886) and Mary Groesbeck Burnet (1846). Her father was educated at the University of Geneva and became a stock broker and member of the New York Stock Exchange before his retirement in c. 1876, shortly before Margot's birth. The family had a home on Fifth Avenue in New York City and summered in Newport, Rhode Island before his death in 1886. Her elder sister, Edith Stone, married Edward Winsloe (later Baron von Winsloe), a major in the German Army during the Franco-Prussian War who served as chamberlain to Princess Viktoria of Schaumburg-Lippe.

Her paternal grandparents were Henry Asaph Stone and Mary (née Foulke) Stone (a daughter of the wealthy banker and merchant Joseph Foulke, who had a summer home "on an eminence at the foot of the present East Eighty-ninth Street, overlooking Hell Gate in the East River" which "adjoined those of the Astors, Bayards, Rhinelanders, Schermerhorns and other prominent New York families"). Through her paternal aunt, Emma Bridge (née Stone) Götz, she was first cousin of Henry Leon Götz (the father of Sir Leon Götz, prominent New New Zealand National Party politician). Her maternal grandparents were Margaret (née Groesbeck) Burnet and Robert Wallace Burnet (a son of U.S. Senator and Justice of the Ohio Supreme Court Jacob Burnet, himself a son of Continental Congressman Dr. William Burnet).

== Society life ==
Margot, who spoke English, French, German and Italian fluently, was educated abroad and with her mother and sister, was "identified with the American colony in Paris." Her mother was a close friend of her first husband's mother. She was a painter of both water colors and oils and made a number of portrait paintings.

== Personal life ==
On 3 February 1904, she was married to Count Alexander Klemens Karl Mauritz von Beroldingen (1877–1940), an Austrian officer in the German Army, at the Episcopal Church of the Incarnation on 35th Street and Madison Avenue in New York City. (Note: Her sister, Emma Stone, was the maid of honor and the bridesmaids were Miss Mamie Pomeroy (her cousin), Gertrude Wood, Mary Fowler and Evelyn Blight. Count von Beroldingen's best man was Groesbeck Fowler (a grandson of U.S. Representative William S. Groesbeck), Count Iván Rubido-Zichy of the Austrian Embassy at Washington, Ives Goddard of Providence (Margot's cousin), Edgar Phelps, Forbes Morgan, Fitzhugh Townsend and Walter Taylor. Among the guests were Mrs. Astor, Mr. and Mrs. Perry Belmont, Mrs. Robert Winthrop, Charles Lanier, Mrs. Vanderbilt, Countess Carola de Laugier-Villars, Miss Cynthia Roche, Rita Barbey, Mrs. Alfred C. Chapin.) Born in Stuttgart, Württemberg (then a Federal State of the German Empire), he was a son of Count Klemens Joseph Leopold von Beroldingen and his wife, Baroness Alexandrine von Hügel (a daughter of Baron Karl Eugen von Hügel). His brother was Egon Reichsgraf von Beroldingen, who served as chairman of VfB Stuttgart and Eintracht Frankfurt, and his mother Alexandrine was a first cousin of Count Paul von Hügel (who married Princess Amalie of Teck, paternal aunt of Queen Mary). Reportedly, at the time of their marriage, the Count "was on voluntary exile from Austria, having left that country because of some prank that had brought disgrace upon him. When he first came to New York he worked as a bartender later becoming a clerk in the United States Express Company." Before their divorce, they were the parents of:

- Countess Margaret Marie Alexandrine von Beroldingen (b. 1904), who traveled abroad often. When she visited the U.S., she stayed with her unmarried aunt, Emma Stone, at the Stone Villa in Newport (formerly the home of James Gordon Bennett Jr.).

On 18 March 1911, she married Samuel Norris (1862–1941) at her mother's house on Bellevue Avenue in Newport, Rhode Island. The son of Samuel and Isabella Eustis (née Dimond) Norris, and grandson of Rhode Island Gov. Francis M. Dimond, he was a graduate of Harvard College and Harvard Law School, he was a representative in the Rhode Island Legislature from 1897 to 1899 and, since 1901, secretary and counsel of the United States Rubber Company. They lived at 45 East 61st Street in New York.

Her first husband, Count von Beroldingen, died in Munich in 1940 and her second husband, Samuel Norris, died in Ridgefield, Connecticut in September 1941. Norris died in 1968, after living at 66 Kay Street in Newport (a home designed by Dudley Newton). Her estate was worth $784,508 in 1971.
