= Hugel (disambiguation) =

Hugel & Fils is a winery in Riquewihr, Alsace, France.

Hugel, Hügel or von Hügel may also refer to:

== People ==
- Baron Charles von Hügel (1795–1870), Austrian army officer, diplomat, botanist, and explorer
- Baron Friedrich von Hügel (1852–1925), Austrian Roman Catholic layman and religious writer, son of Charles
- Baron Anatole von Hügel (1854–1928), co-founder St Edmund's College in Cambridge, son of Charles
- Baroness Pauline von Hügel (1858–1901), Italian-born Austrian baroness, British writer, philanthropist, daughter of Charles
- Gustav Hügel, Austrian figure skater, 1897 and 1899-1900 world champion
- Jean Hugel (1924–2009), Alsatian wine producer
- Max Hugel (1925–2007), American businessman and government official
- Hugel (DJ) (born 1987), French DJ and house music producer

== Other uses ==
- Villa Hügel, a mansion belonging to the Krupp family, in Bredeney, Germany
- Von Hügel Institute, an academic research institute based at Cambridge, England

== See also ==
- Erika Hügel-Marshall (born 1947), Afro-German author and activist
- Essen-Hügel station, station in Essen, Germany
- Bernard Hügl (1908-1982), Croatian football player and manager
