= Duke Alexander of Württemberg (1804–1885) =

German nobleman

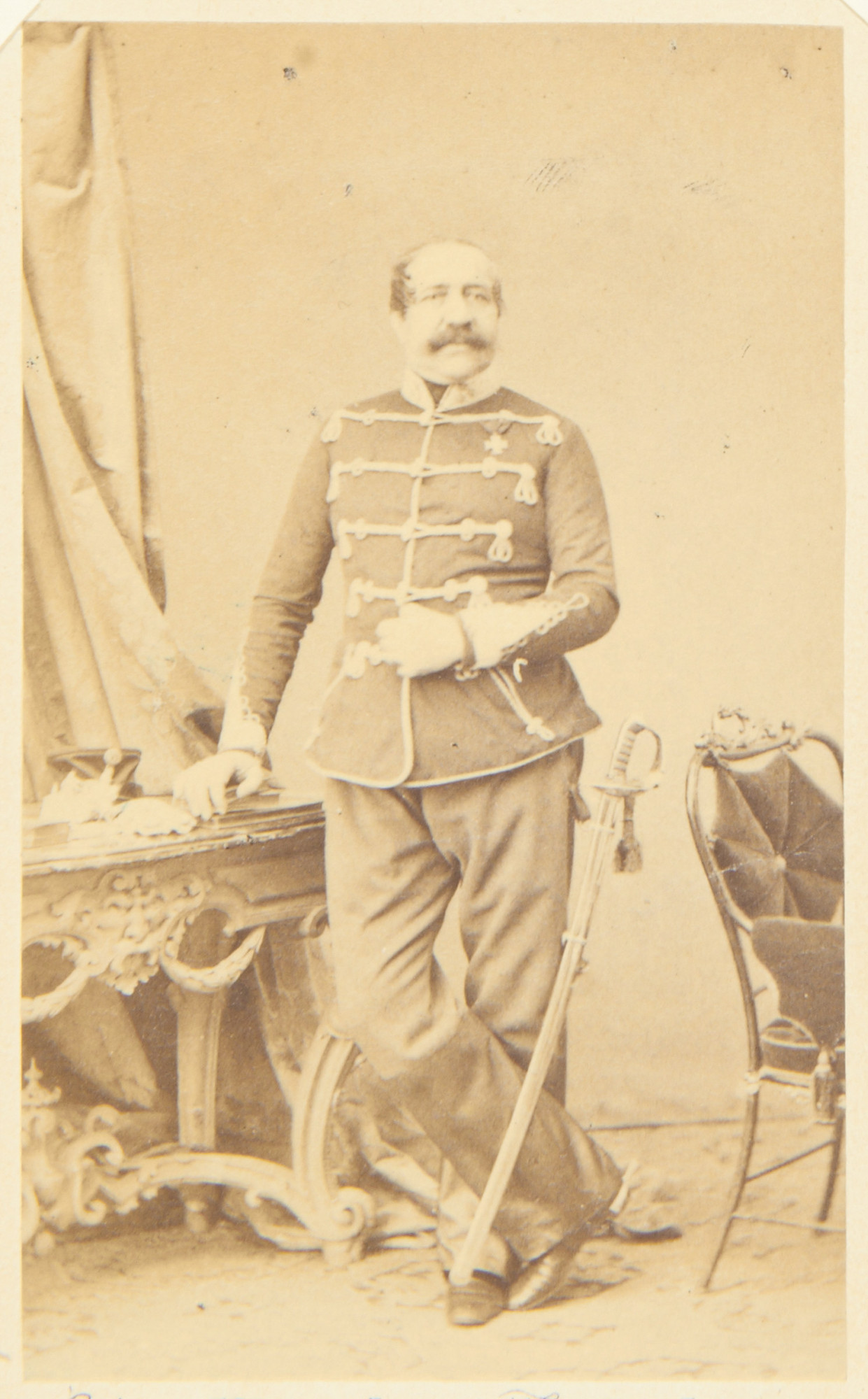
- Alexander in 1861
- Born: 9 September 1804; Saint Petersburg, Russia
- Died: 4 July 1885 (aged 80); Tüffer, Duchy of Styria, Austria-Hungary
- Spouse: Countess Claudine Rhédey von Kis-Rhéde (m. 1835; died 1841)
- Issue: Princess Claudine of Teck; Prince Francis, Duke of Teck; Princess Amelie, Countess of Hügel
Names
- Alexander Paul Ludwig Konstantin
- House: Württemberg
- Father: Duke Louis of Württemberg
- Mother: Princess Henriette of Nassau-Weilburg

Duke Alexander Paul Ludwig Konstantin of Württemberg (9 September 1804 – 4 July 1885) was a German nobleman. His son, Francis, Duke of Teck, was the father of Mary of Teck, queen consort to George V of the United Kingdom.

== Life ==
He was born on 9 September 1804 the son of Duke Louis of Württemberg (1756–1817), the younger brother of Frederick I of Württemberg, the first king of Württemberg, and the second son of Frederick II Eugene, Duke of Württemberg (1732–1797). His mother was Princess Henriette of Nassau-Weilburg (1780–1857), a daughter of Charles Christian, Prince of Nassau-Weilburg, and great-granddaughter of George II of Great Britain by his eldest daughter Anne, Princess Royal.

== Marriage and issue ==
In 1835, he married Countess Claudine Rhédey von Kis-Rhéde (1812–1841), a Hungarian noblewoman whose non-royal ancestry resulted in the marriage being considered morganatic, thus depriving her issue of their paternal royal titles, status, and inheritance. She was granted the title Countess von Hohenstein in her own right. In 1841, having fallen from her horse, she was trampled by other horses and killed. After his wife's death Alexander suffered a mental breakdown, a condition which lasted for the rest of his life.

By his wife, he had issue: one son and two daughters. In 1863, his children were all elevated by Alexander's first cousin and brother-in-law William I of Württemberg to the rank of Princes and Princesses of Teck. His eldest son, Francis was elevated to Duke of Teck upon marriage.

- Princess Claudine of Teck (1836–1894).
- Prince Francis, Duke of Teck (1837–1900) who on 12 June 1866 at St Anne's Church, Kew, in England, married Princess Mary Adelaide of Cambridge (1833– 1897), younger daughter of Prince Adolphus, Duke of Cambridge (1774– 1850) the seventh and youngest son of King George III of the United Kingdom. The couple were very distant cousins, both being descended from George I of Great Britain. (Note: Sophia Dorothea of Hanover only daughter of King George I, mother of Princess Sophia Dorothea of Prussia mother of Princess Friederike of Brandenburg-Schwedt mother of Duke Louis of Württemberg father of Duke Alexander of Württemberg) In 1871, five years after his marriage, Francis was raised by his second cousin King Charles I of Württemberg (son of King William I) to the title Duke of Teck, a hereditary title in the Kingdom of Württemberg, but without any accompanying grant of land. Francis's sisters were not given any similar new status and remained Princesses of Teck. By his wife, Francis had issue: three sons and one daughter:
  - Mary of Teck (1867–1953; known in the royal family as May) who in 1893 married Prince George, Duke of York, the future George V;
  - Adolphus Cambridge, 1st Marquess of Cambridge (1868–1927), formerly Duke of Teck (Note: Ordinal numbers of peerage titles are omitted by convention when holder is royalty (see Wikipedia:Naming conventions (royalty and nobility)#Royals with a substantive title)) (having succeeded his father), which German title was surrendered by him during World War I for political reasons and replaced by the British title of Marquess of Cambridge;
  - Prince Francis of Teck (1870–1910), died unmarried;
  - Alexander Cambridge, 1st Earl of Athlone (1874–1957), formerly Prince Alexander of Teck, which German title was surrendered by him during World War I for political reasons and replaced by the British title of Earl of Athlone;
- Princess Amalie of Teck (1838–1893) who on 24 October 1863 married Carl Ernst Ludwig Paul, Count von Hügel (1835– 1897), by whom she had issue:
  - Paul-Julius, Count von Hügel (1872–1912) who married Anna Pauline Homolatsch (1876–), divorced in 1911, by whom he had issue:
    - Countess Huberta Amelia Maximilienne Pauline von Hügel (1897–1912)
    - Ferdinand Paul, Count von Hügel (1901– 1939)

== Ancestry ==
Ancestors of Duke Alexander of Württemberg (1804–1885)

8. Charles Alexander, Duke of Württemberg
4. Frederick II Eugene, Duke of Württemberg
9. Princess Marie Auguste of Thurn and Taxis
2. Duke Louis of Württemberg
10. Frederick William, Margrave of Brandenburg-Schwedt
5. Princess Friederike of Brandenburg-Schwedt
11. Princess Sophia Dorothea of Prussia
1. Duke Alexander of Württemberg
12. Charles August, Prince of Nassau-Weilburg
6. Charles Christian, Prince of Nassau-Weilburg
13. Princess Auguste Friederike of Nassau-Idstein
3. Princess Henriette of Nassau-Weilburg
14. William IV, Prince of Orange
7. Princess Carolina of Orange-Nassau
15. Anne, Princess Royal
