= Von Hügel =

German noble family

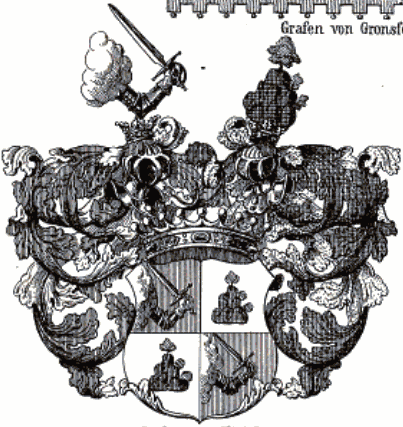
Comital arms of the family

The Hügel family is a German noble family originating in Württemberg.

== History ==
In 1790, members of the younger branch of the Hügel family were elevated to the rank of Imperial Baron by Emperor Leopold II, while members of the elder branch of the family were raised to the same rank by Emperor Francis II in 1801.

On 13 June 1879, the elder branch of the family was raised to the hereditary title of Count (Graf) in the Kingdom of Württemberg by King Charles I. This comital branch of the Hügel family was closely related to the Dukes of Teck, a morganatic line of the House of Württemberg. Countess Amalie von Hügel was the paternal aunt of Queen Mary.

== Notable members ==
- Baron Johann Andres von Hügel (1734–1807), Württemberg general who was elevated to the rank of Baron in 1801
  - Johann Christian Friedrich von Hügel (b. 1764)
  - Baron Ernst von Hügel (1774–1848), Württemberg general and Minister of War
    - Baron Albert von Hügel (1803–1865), German army officer and chamberlain, owner of Schloss Eschenau
      - Count Paul von Hügel (1835–1897), owner of Schloss Reinthal; m. Princess Amalie of Teck
        - Count Paul Julius von Hügel (1872–1912) ⚭ Anna Pauline Homolatsch (b. 1880), divorced in 1911
          - Countess Huberta Amelia Maximilienne Pauline von Hügel (1897–1912)
          - Count Ferdinand Paul von Hügel (1901-1939)
    - Baron Karl Eugen von Hügel (1805–1870), Württemberg Minister of Foreign Affairs
      - Baroness Alexandrine von Hügel (1843–1903), m. Count Klemens Joseph Leopold von Beroldingen
        - Count Alexander Klemens Karl Mauritz von Beroldingen (1877–1940), m. Margot Marie Stone
        - Egon Reichsgraf von Beroldingen (1885–1933), chairman of VfB Stuttgart and Eintracht Frankfurt; m. Nora von Beroldingen (née Kapp von Gültstein)
  - August Ferdinand von Hügel (1775–1837)
- Matthias Hügel (d. 1782), Electoral Trier chamberlain; married Anna Gertrud Dötsch
  - Baron Johann Aloys Josef von Hügel (1753–1825), diplomat, statesman and imperial commissioner at the Perpetual Reichstag in Regensburg, who was elevated to Baron of the Holy Roman Empire in 1791; married Susanne Holthoff (1768–1837)
    - Baron Charles von Hügel (1795–1870), Austrian army officer, diplomat, botanist and explorer; married Elizabeth Farquharson (1830-1913)
      - Baron Friedrich von Hügel (1852–1925), Austrian Roman Catholic layman and religious writer; married the Hon. Mary Catherine Herbert (1849–1935), daughter of Sidney Herbert, 1st Baron Herbert of Lea; had issue
      - Baron Anatole von Hügel (1854–1928), co-founder of St Edmund's College in Cambridge
      - Baroness Pauline von Hügel (1858–1901), Austrian-British religious writer

== Former properties ==
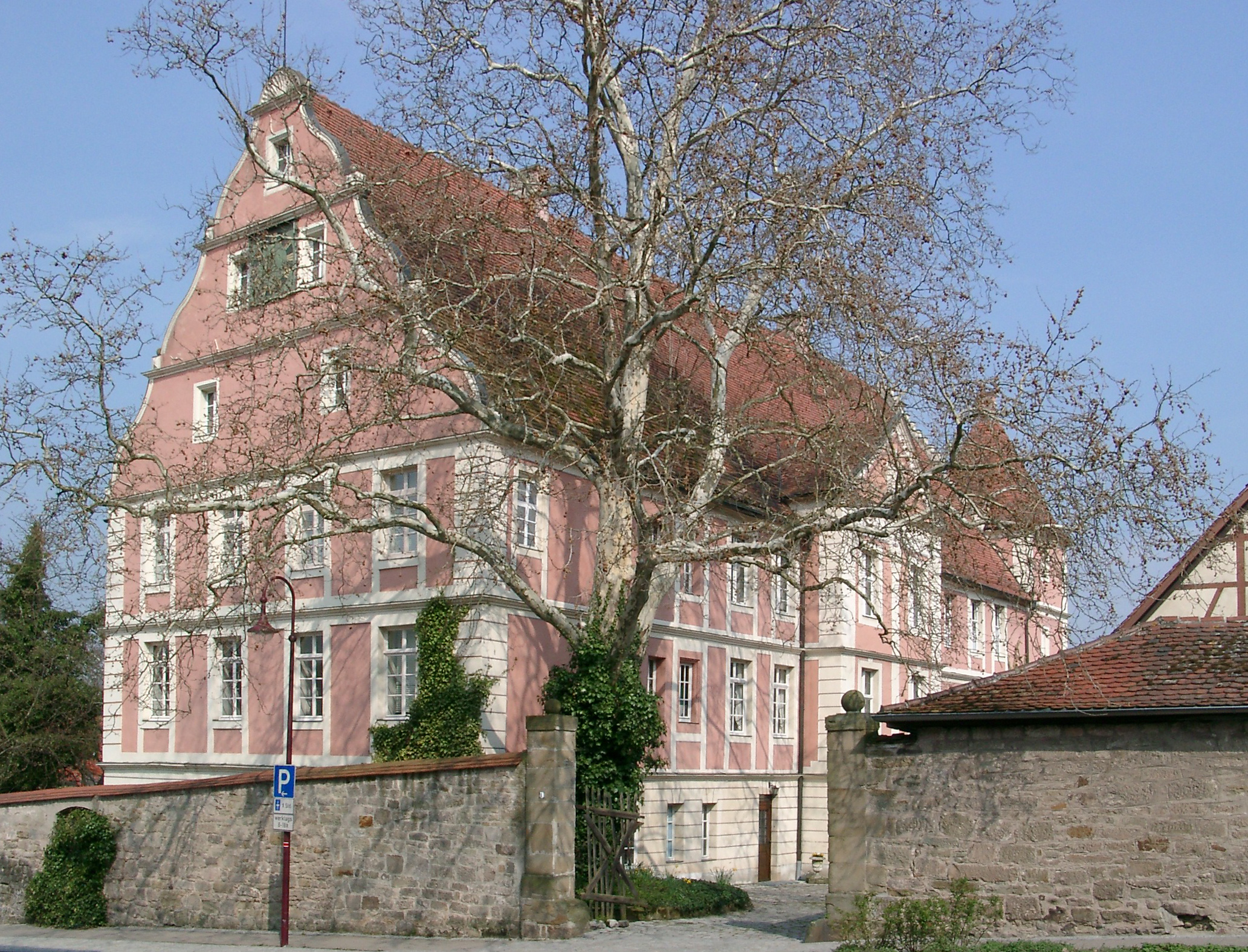
Schloss Eschenau in Heilbronn, owned by the Hügel family in the 19th century

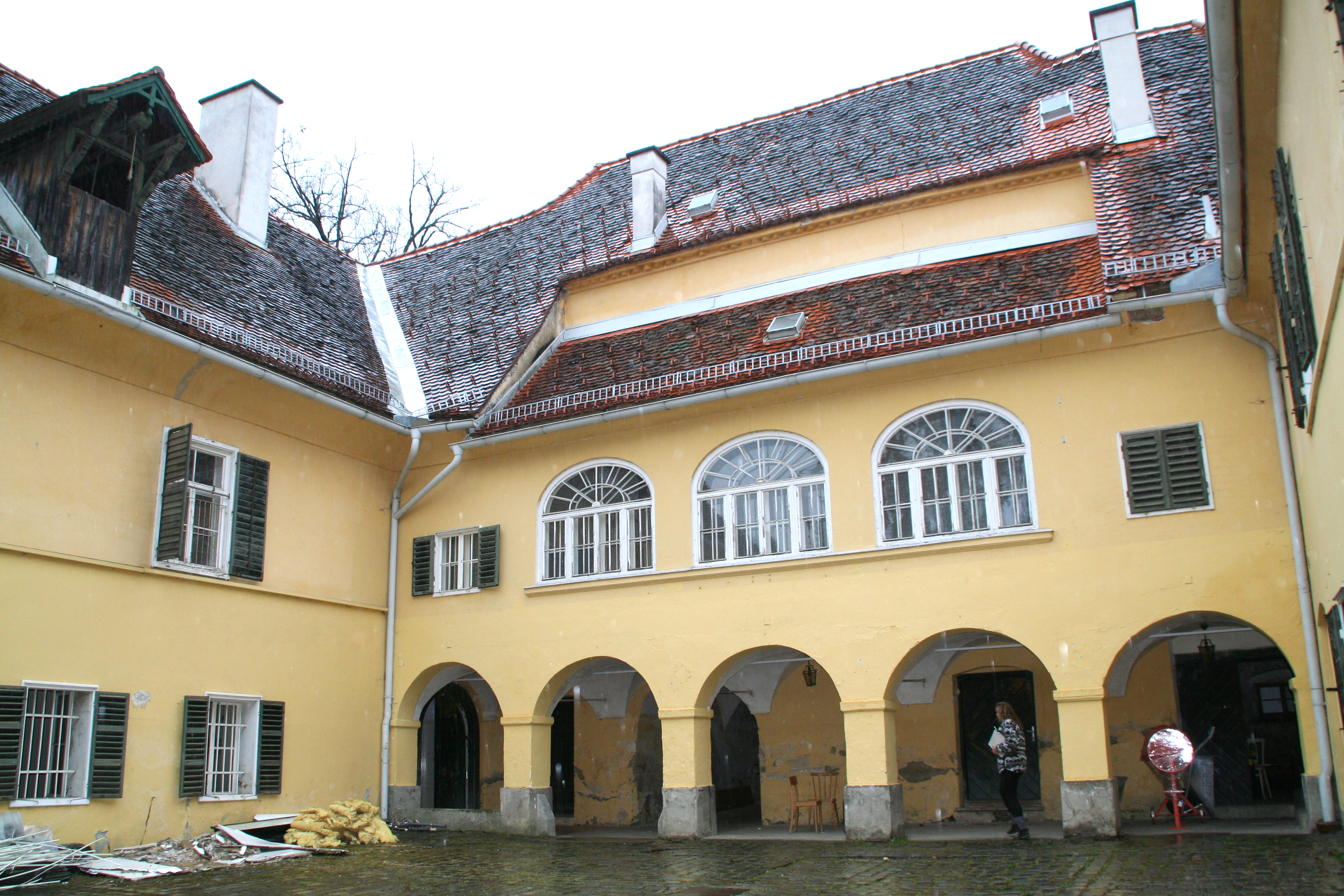
Schloss Reinthal near Graz, owned by the Hügel family in the 19th century

== See also ==
- Hugel (disambiguation)
