= Francis, Duke of Teck =

Austrian-born British nobleman (1837–1900)

Francis
- Duke of Teck
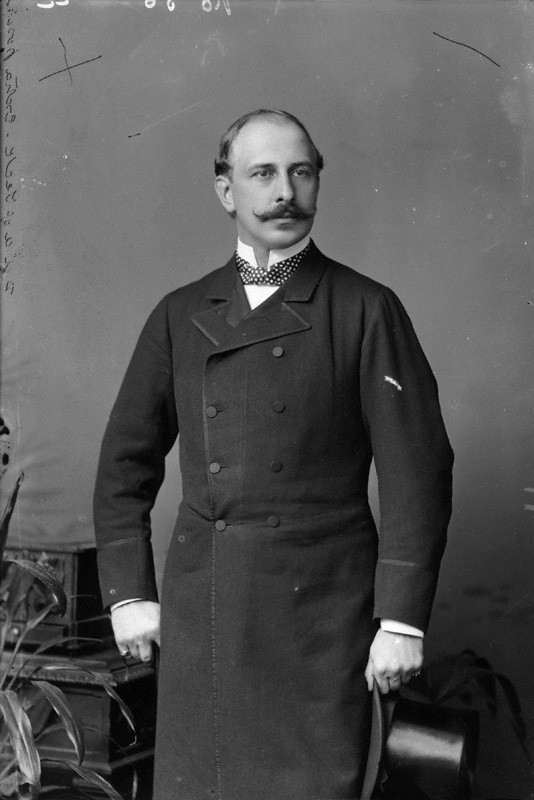
- Teck in c. 1888
- Born: Count Francis von Hohenstein; 28 August 1837; Esseg, Slavonia, Austrian Empire (modern-day Osijek, Croatia)
- Died: 21 January 1900 (aged 62); White Lodge, Richmond Park, Surrey, England
- Burial: 27 January 1900; Royal Vault, St George's Chapel, Windsor Castle
- Spouse: Princess Mary Adelaide of Cambridge (m. 1866; died 1897)
- Issue: Mary, Queen of the United Kingdom; Adolphus Cambridge, 1st Marquess of Cambridge; Prince Francis of Teck; Alexander Cambridge, 1st Earl of Athlone
Names
- Francis Paul Charles Louis Alexander; German: Franz Paul Karl Ludwig Alexander
- House: Teck
- Father: Duke Alexander of Württemberg
- Mother: Countess Claudine Rhédey de Kis-Rhéde

Francis, Duke of Teck (Francis Paul Charles Louis Alexander; German: Herzog Franz Paul Karl Ludwig Alexander von Teck; 28 August 1837 – 21 January 1900), known as Count Francis von Hohenstein until 1863, was an Austrian-born nobleman who married into the British royal family. His wife, Princess Mary Adelaide of Cambridge, was a first cousin of Queen Victoria. He was the father of Queen Mary, the consort of King George V, and thus maternal grandfather of both Edward VIII and George VI. Francis held the Austrian title of Count of Hohenstein (Graf von Hohenstein), and the German titles of Prince (Fürst) and later Duke of Teck (Herzog von Teck), and was given the style of Serene Highness in 1863. He was granted the British style of Highness in 1887.

== Background and early military career ==
Francis was born on 28 August 1837 in Esseg, Slavonia (now Osijek, Croatia), and christened Franz Paul Karl Ludwig Alexander. His father was Duke Alexander of Württemberg, the son of Duke Louis of Württemberg. His mother was Hungarian Countess Claudine Rhédey de Kis-Rhéde. The marriage was morganatic, meaning that Francis had no succession rights to the Kingdom of Württemberg. His title at birth was Count Francis von Hohenstein, after his mother was created Countess von Hohenstein in her own right by Emperor Ferdinand I of Austria.

He was educated at the Imperial and Royal Technical Military Academy from 1849 to 1853 and joined the Imperial Austrian Army as a lieutenant in the 1st Lancers in 1854. He transferred to the Guard Squadron in 1858 and later became a Captain (Rittmeister) in the 7th Hussars. He served as Orderly Officer under Count von Wimpffen in Italy during the Austro-Sardinian War and was awarded the gold medal for distinguished service at the Battle of Solferino and the bronze war medal, 1859.

In 1863, Francis was created Prince of Teck, with the style of Serene Highness, in the Kingdom of Württemberg. He served during the Austro-Prussian War and retired from the Austrian Army when he married and moved to England in 1866.

== Marriage and dukedom ==
Francis, Duke of Teck, and Mary Adelaide, Duchess of Teck, with Duke Philipp and Duchess Marie Therese of Württemberg in England, around 1866

As the product of a morganatic marriage, and without succession rights to the throne, Francis was not acceptable as a husband for princesses in most of the European royal houses. Further, Francis had little income in comparison with other European princes. He thus married into a richer family, by marrying his father's third cousin (in descent from George II of Great Britain) Princess Mary Adelaide of Cambridge, the younger daughter of Prince Adolphus, Duke of Cambridge, the 7th and youngest son of King George III.

The couple married on 12 June 1866 at St Anne's Church, Kew, in Surrey. They had one daughter and three sons:

- Princess Victoria Mary of Teck (1867–1953); later Queen Mary, consort of King George V of the United Kingdom.
- Prince Adolphus of Teck (1868–1927); later Duke of Teck and Marquess of Cambridge.
- Prince Francis of Teck (1870–1910).
- Prince Alexander of Teck (1874–1957); later Earl of Athlone.

He was created Duke of Teck by the King of Württemberg in 1871.

Teck had dreadful rages – his daughter May later recalled him hurling a plate at his wife when she was young.

== Later military career ==
Teck was made Honorary Colonel of the 1st Surrey Artillery Volunteers on 15 June 1867 and continued as supernumerary Honorary Colonel of the 1st City of London Artillery after the units merged in 1883. He was also made Honorary Colonel of the 49th Middlesex Rifle Volunteers (Post Office Rifles) on 16 August 1876.

He was attached to the staff of British General Sir Garnet Wolseley during the Egyptian campaign of 1882. He received the silver medal for the Battle of Tel-el-Kebir, the Khedive's Star, and the Order of Osmanieh, first class. On his return from Egypt he was gazetted a Colonel in the British Army.

The Duke of Teck was made Colonel (Oberst) à la suite of the 25th (1st Württemberg) Dragoons "Queen Olga" on 6 March 1889, and a Generalmajor in the Imperial German Army on 18 October 1891. He was made a supernumerary Major-General in the British Army in July 1893 and a Generalleutnant in the German Army on 18 April 1895.

Because Francis had no inheritance, the couple lived on Mary Adelaide's Parliamentary allowance of £5,000 per annum (equivalent to ca. £525,000 in 2013), supplemented by income from her mother, the Duchess of Cambridge. Mary Adelaide's requests to her cousin, Queen Victoria, for more funds were met with refusal; however, they were granted a grace-and-favour apartment in Kensington Palace, London, and a country house, White Lodge, the former Royal deer-hunting lodge in Richmond Park, Southwest London.

The Duke and Duchess lived beyond their means, leading to the build-up of large debts. In 1883, the Tecks fled the UK to continental Europe, where they stayed with relatives in Florence and Germany. Teck had a stroke in Florence aged forty-seven. They eventually returned to the UK in 1885.

== Later life and death ==
With an Order in Council on 1 July 1887, Queen Victoria granted Francis the style of Highness, as a gift to celebrate her Golden Jubilee. Despite this, the Tecks were still seen as minor relatives, with little status or wealth. Their fortunes improved when their only daughter, Princess Victoria Mary of Teck (known as "May" to her family) became engaged to the second-in-line to the British throne, Prince Albert Victor, Duke of Clarence and Avondale. There was initial opposition to the match from the Duke of Clarence's parents, the Prince and Princess of Wales. Arthur Balfour wrote to Lord Salisbury in 1890 that "(t)he Teck girl they won't have because they hate Teck and because the vision of Princess Mary haunting Marlborough House makes the Prince of Wales ill." Nevertheless, the Queen gave her official consent to the engagement on 12 December 1891. The death of the Duke of Clarence only six weeks later was a cruel blow. However, Princess May consented when the Duke of Clarence's brother (and next in the line of succession), Prince George, Duke of York, proposed to her instead.

In Who's Who, the Duke of Teck listed his recreations as "a little of all". He was President of the Royal Botanic Society and a member of numerous club, including White's, the Marlborough Club, the Bachelors' Club, the Army and Navy Club, the United Service Club, the Cavalry Club, the Naval and Military Club, the Travellers Club, The Hurlingham Club, the Ranelagh Club, and the Jockey Club, as well as the Adels-Casino in Vienna and the Herren-Casino in Stuttgart.

By 1897 the Duke, who had always been irascible, was experiencing memory problems and had difficulty remembering words. After the death of his wife that year Teck became mentally unhinged. The Duchess left no will, causing further financial problems. He was sent to Stuttgart to stay with his cousin the Duke of Wurtemberg, where his deranged rantings brought on another stroke and he had to return to England; he stayed at White Lodge under the care of a doctor and four medical attendants. He was last visited by his daughter May (the future Queen Mary) in October 1898, by which time he had a white beard and was barefoot in a nightgown; he recognised his daughter but she was asked not to visit him again as her visit had agitated him. For the last year of his life he was, in the medical language of the time, "an imbecile".

Teck died of another stroke on 21 January 1900 at White Lodge. He was buried next to his wife in the Royal Vault at St George's Chapel, Windsor Castle.

There is a pub in Earls Court, London, called the Prince of Teck.

== Titles, styles, honours, and arms ==
=== Titles and styles ===
- 28 August 1837 – 1 December 1863: His Illustrious Highness Count Francis of Hohenstein
- 1 December 1863 – 16 September 1871: His Serene Highness Francis, Prince of Teck
- 16 September 1871 – 21 January 1900: His Serene Highness Francis, Duke of Teck
- In the UK: 1 July 1887 – 21 January 1900: His Highness Francis, Duke of Teck

=== Honours ===
- Württemberg:
  - Grand Cross of the Order of the Württemberg Crown
  - Grand Cross of the Friedrich Order
- United Kingdom:
  - GCB: Honorary Knight Grand Cross of the Most Honourable Order of the Bath (civil division), 12 June 1866
  - Egypt Medal, 1882
  - Khedive's Star, 1882
  - GCVO: Knight Grand Cross of the Royal Victorian Order, 30 June 1897
  - KStJ: Knight of Justice of the Venerable Order of Saint John of Jerusalem
- Mecklenburg: Grand Cross of the House Order of the Wendish Crown, with Crown in Ore, 11 June 1866
- (Austrian Empire) (Kingdom of Hungary) Austria-Hungary: Grand Cross of the Imperial Order of Leopold, 1869
- Grand Duchy of Hesse: Grand Cross of the Grand Ducal Hessian Order of Ludwig, 9 July 1881
- Ottoman Empire: Order of Osmanieh, 1st Class, 1882
- Kingdom of Prussia: Grand Cross of the Order of the Red Eagle, 28 July 1891

=== Arms ===
Arms of Francis, Duke of Teck

== Book cited ==
- Ridley, Jane (2021), Never A Dull Moment, London: Chatto & Windus, ISBN 0701188707 (a biography of George V)

German nobility
New creation	Duke of Teck; 1871–1900	Succeeded by Prince Adolphus of Teck
