= Princess Mary Adelaide of Cambridge =

Duchess of Teck (1833–1897)

Princess Mary Adelaide
- Duchess of Teck (more)
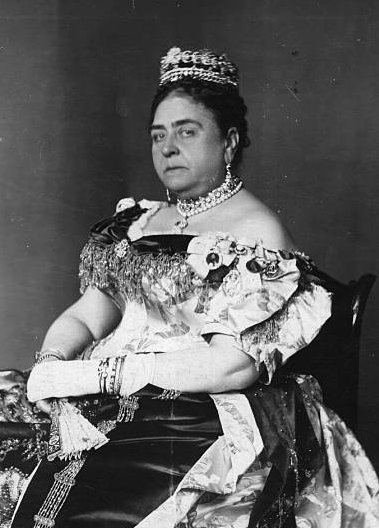
- Photograph, c. 1893
- Born: 27 November 1833; Hanover, Kingdom of Hanover, German Confederation
- Died: 27 October 1897 (aged 63); White Lodge, Richmond Park, Surrey, United Kingdom
- Burial: 3 November 1897; Royal Vault, St George's Chapel, Windsor Castle
- Spouse: Francis, Duke of Teck (m. 1866)
- Issue: Mary, Queen of the United Kingdom; Adolphus Cambridge, 1st Marquess of Cambridge; Prince Francis of Teck; Alexander Cambridge, 1st Earl of Athlone
Names
- Mary Adelaide Wilhelmina Elizabeth
- House: Hanover
- Father: Prince Adolphus, Duke of Cambridge
- Mother: Princess Augusta of Hesse-Kassel

Princess Mary Adelaide of Cambridge (Mary Adelaide Wilhelmina Elizabeth; 27 November 1833 – 27 October 1897), later known as the Duchess of Teck, was a member of the British royal family. She was one of the first royals to patronise a wide range of charities and was a first cousin of Queen Victoria.

Mary Adelaide was the daughter of Prince Adolphus, Duke of Cambridge, and Princess Augusta of Hesse-Kassel. Her father was the seventh son of King George III and Queen Charlotte. Mary Adelaide married Francis, Duke of Teck, with whom she had four children. The Duke and Duchess of Teck's daughter, Victoria Mary, commonly known as "May", was the wife of George V and became known as Queen Mary. Through her daughter, Mary Adelaide was the grandmother of the British kings Edward VIII and George VI.

== Early life ==
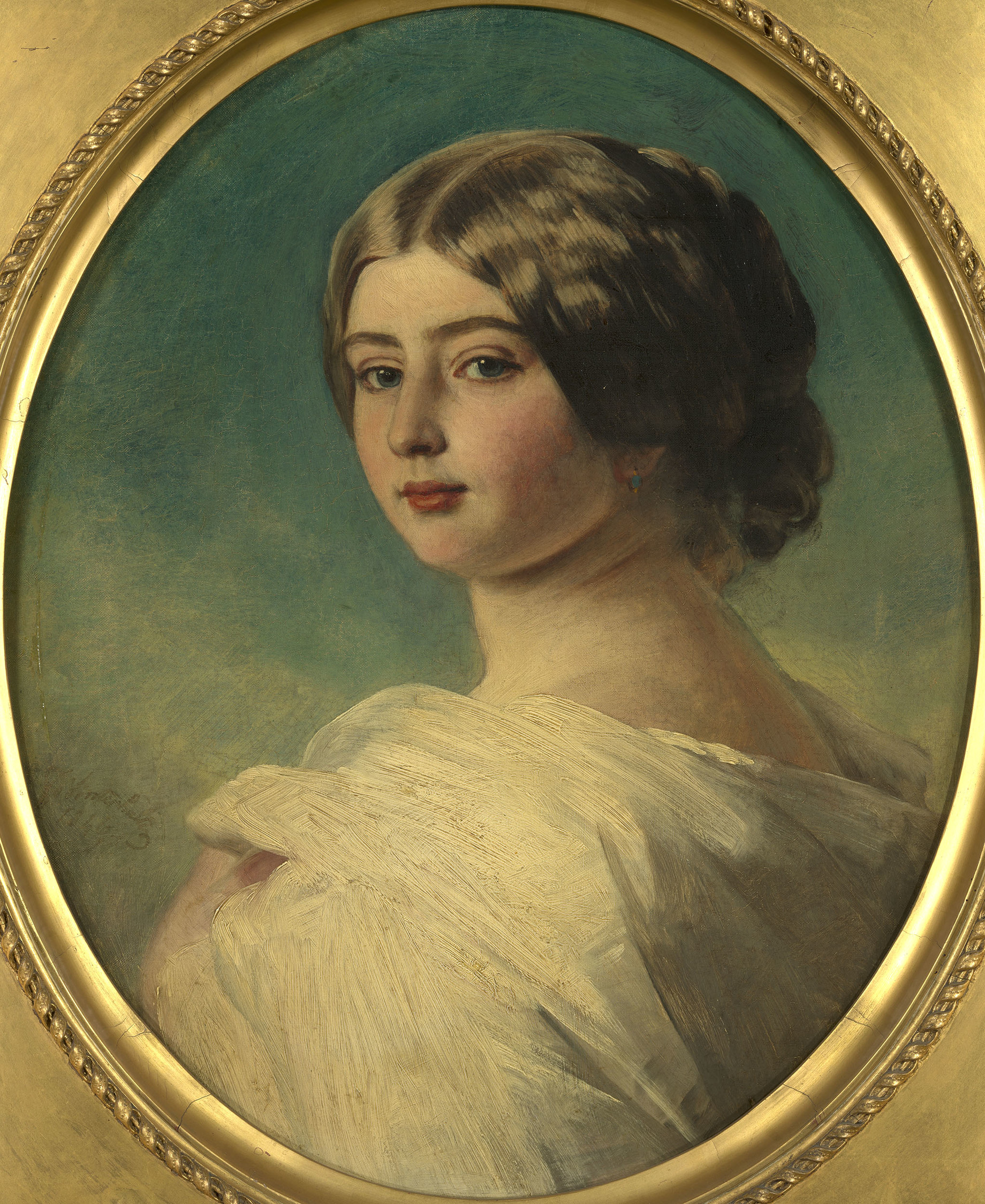
Portrait by Franz Xaver Winterhalter in the Royal Collection, 1846

Mary Adelaide was born on 27 November 1833 in the Kingdom of Hanover, German Confederation. Her father was Prince Adolphus, Duke of Cambridge, the youngest surviving son of George III and Charlotte of Mecklenburg-Strelitz. Her mother was Princess Augusta of Hesse-Kassel, the daughter of Prince Frederick of Hesse-Kassel. As a male-line granddaughter of a British monarch, she was styled as a British princess with the prefix of Royal Highness.

The young Princess was baptised on 9 January 1834 at Cambridge House, Hanover, by Revd. John Ryle Wood, Chaplain to the Duke of Cambridge. Her godmother and paternal aunt Princess Elizabeth, Landgravine of Hesse-Homburg, was the only godparent who was present. The others were William IV and Queen Adelaide (her paternal uncle and aunt), Princess Mary, Duchess of Gloucester and Edinburgh (her paternal aunt), Princess Marie of Hesse-Kassel (her maternal aunt) and Princess Marie Luise Charlotte of Hesse-Kassel (her maternal first cousin). She was named Mary Adelaide Wilhelmina Elizabeth for her aunts and uncle.

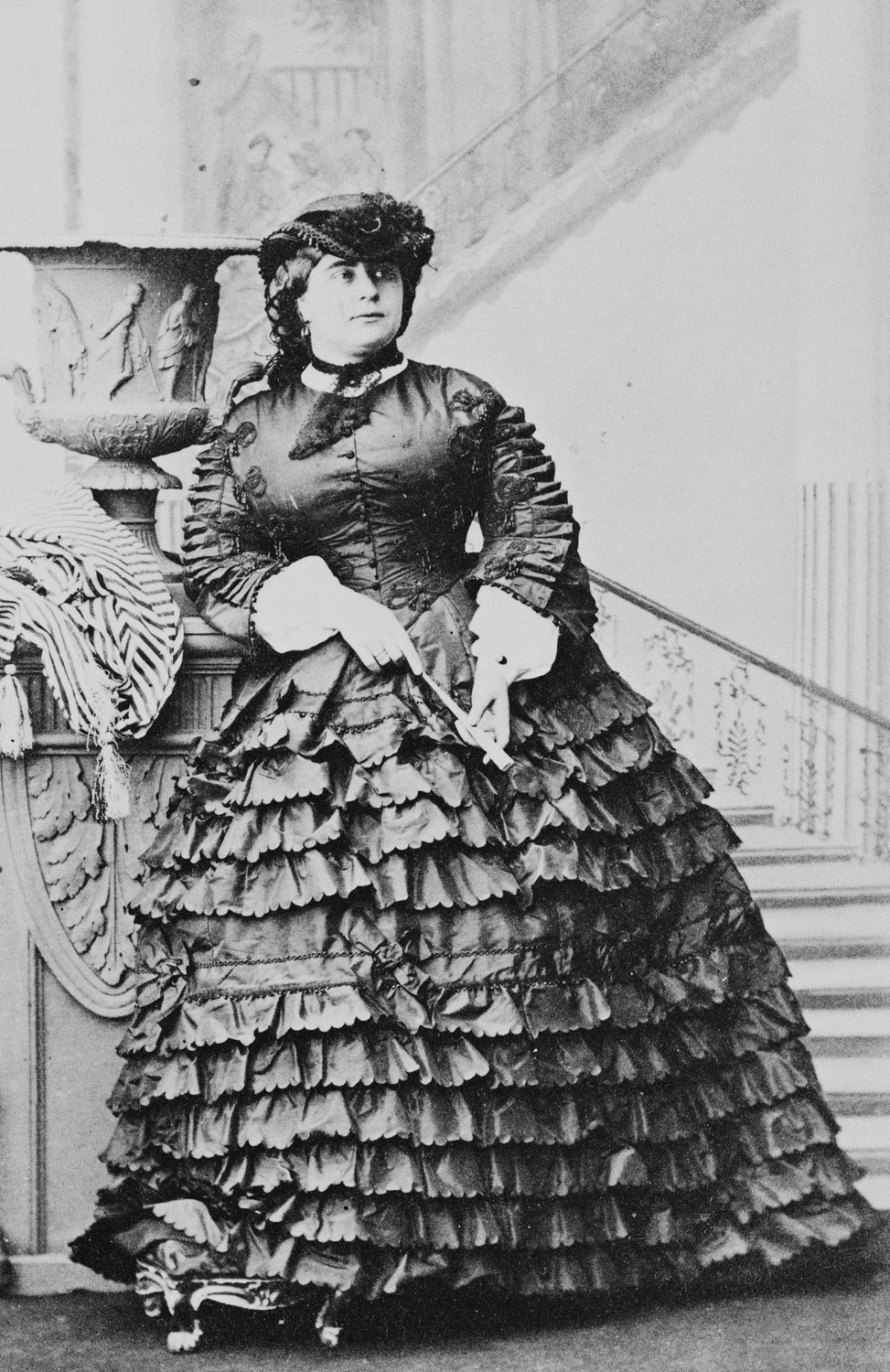
Photograph by Camille Silvy, 1860

Mary Adelaide spent the early years of her life in Hanover, where her father acted as viceroy, in place of her uncles George IV and later William IV.

After the death of William IV in 1837, Mary Adelaide's first cousin, Princess Alexandrina Victoria of Kent, ascended the throne. However, under Salic law, only patrilineal succession was allowed and this prevented Victoria from also ascending the throne of Hanover, which instead passed to Mary Adelaide's uncle, Prince Ernest Augustus, Duke of Cumberland. Thus, the personal union between Britain and Hanover, which had existed for over a century, came to an end along with the arrangement of Hanover's ruler living in England as the British monarch and using a viceroy to represent him in Hanover. The Duke of Cumberland moved to Hanover as king and Mary Adelaide's father, no longer needed in Hanover, returned to London with his family, setting up residence in Kensington Palace.

== Marriage ==
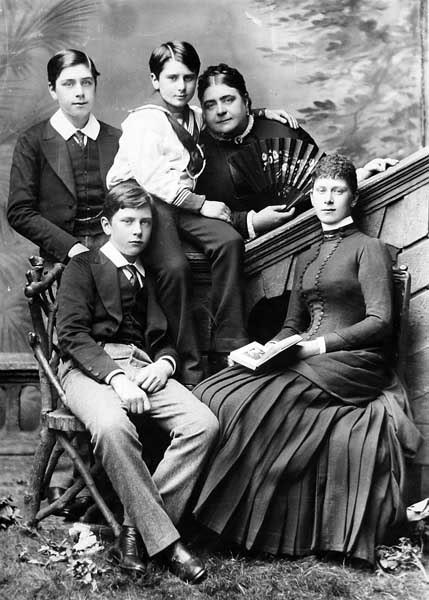
The Duchess of Teck and her family c. 1883; Prince Alexander sits centre with his arm around the Duchess, Princess Mary (later Queen Mary), is seated at far right.

By the age of 30, Mary Adelaide was still unmarried. At one point, King Victor Emmanuel II of Italy was thought of as a possible husband for Mary Adelaide. He had a scandalous reputation and was a notorious womaniser; it was said that whenever he visited a country, he went to the theatre and music halls and sent notes propositioning the chorus girls. His behaviour in England did little to enhance his reputation. Mary Adelaide's above-average weight (earning her the disparaging epithet of "Fat Mary") and lack of income were also considered to deter potential suitors, as was her advancing age.

Eventually, a suitable candidate was found by the Prince of Wales and his wife Princess Alexandra on a visit to the Austrian court at Vienna in 1865. During the visit, they met and took a liking to a young officer in the Austrian Army, Prince Francis of Teck, a minor member of the royal family of Württemberg. Francis was of lower rank than Mary Adelaide, was the product of a morganatic marriage and had no succession rights to the throne of Württemberg, but was at least of princely title and of royal blood. He was also considered to be "the most handsome man at the Austrian court", where he was known as Der schöne Uhlan, "the handsome cavalry officer". The Prince of Wales invited the young officer to visit the royal court in Britain, and upon Francis's arrival on 6 March 1866 arranged for him to meet Mary Adelaide. "The wooing was but a short affair", according to Mary Adelaide: the pair were introduced on 7 March, and a month later were engaged, much to the satisfaction of Mary Adelaide's family. "Everyone seemed to think it would do", Mary Adelaide's daughter May would later say, "and it did". The couple were married on 12 June 1866 at St Anne's Church, Kew, Surrey.

The Duke and Duchess of Teck chose to reside in London rather than abroad, mainly because Mary Adelaide received £5,000 per annum as a parliamentary annuity and carried out royal duties. Her mother, the Duchess of Cambridge, also provided her with supplementary income. Requests to Queen Victoria for extra funds were generally refused; however, the Queen did provide the Tecks with apartments at Kensington Palace and White Lodge in Richmond Park as a country house.

Mary Adelaide requested that her new husband be granted the style Royal Highness, but this was refused by Queen Victoria. The Queen did, however, promote Francis to the rank of Highness in 1887 in celebration of her Golden Jubilee.

=== Children ===
The Tecks had four children:

Name	Birth	Death	Notes
Princess Victoria Mary of Teck	26 May 1867	24 March 1953	married Prince George, Duke of York (later George V) on 6 July 1893. They had six children, including Edward VIII and George VI.
Prince Adolphus of Teck	13 August 1868	23 October 1927	later Duke of Teck and Marquess of Cambridge; married Lady Margaret Evelyn Grosvenor on 12 December 1894. They had four children.
Prince Francis of Teck	9 January 1870	22 October 1910	Died unmarried.
Prince Alexander of Teck	14 April 1874	16 January 1957	later Earl of Athlone; married Princess Alice of Albany on 10 February 1904. They had three children.

== Life abroad ==
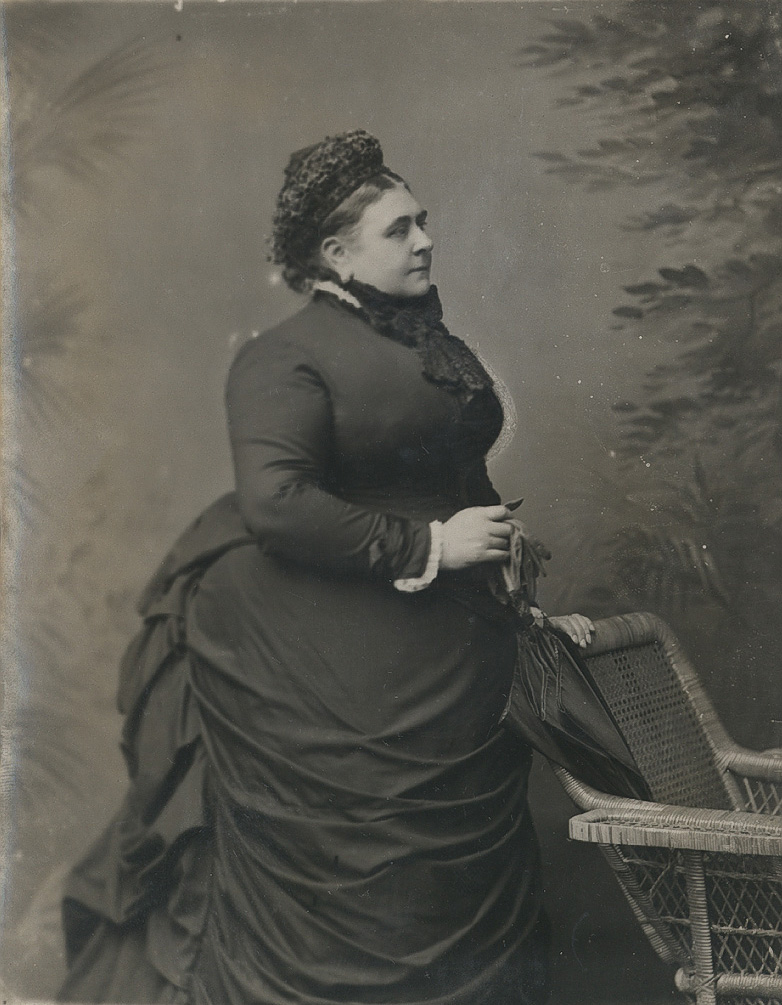
Mary Adelaide, c. 1880

Despite the couple's modest income, Mary Adelaide had expensive tastes and lived an extravagant life of parties, expensive food and clothes and holidays abroad. In 1883 they were forced to live more cheaply abroad in order to reduce their debts. With their children, they travelled to Florence, Italy, and also stayed with relatives in Germany and Austria. Initially, they travelled under the names of the Count and Countess von Hohenstein. However, Mary Adelaide wished to travel in more style and reverted to her actual title, which commanded significantly more attention and better service.

== Later life and death ==
The Tecks returned from their self-imposed exile in 1885 and continued to live at Kensington Palace and White Lodge in Richmond Park. Mary Adelaide began devoting her life to charity, serving as patron to Barnardo's, the NSPCC and other children's charities. Fat Mary, as she was affectionately known, was popular, especially in the East End of London, and Queen Victoria was thought to be jealous of her popularity.

Mary Adelaide was chronically unpunctual, and it was joked in the family that her daughter May had read the whole of John Lothrop Motley's three volume Rise of the Dutch Republic waiting for her mother. She used to quiz her bookish daughter, who acted as her mother's secretary, about her reading and impress clever men by talking about the books as though she had read them herself.

In 1891, Mary Adelaide was keen for her daughter, Princess Victoria Mary of Teck (known as "May"), to marry one of the sons of the Prince of Wales, the future Edward VII. At the same time, Queen Victoria wanted a British-born bride for the future king, though of course one of royal rank and ancestry, and Mary Adelaide's daughter fulfilled the rank criteria. After Queen Victoria's approval, May became engaged to Prince Albert Victor, Duke of Clarence and Avondale, second in line to the British throne. He died suddenly six weeks later. Queen Victoria was fond of Princess Mary and persuaded the Duke of Clarence's brother and next in the line of succession, Prince George, Duke of York, to marry her instead. They married in the Chapel Royal, St James's Palace, on 6 July 1893.

Mary Adelaide was so obese in later life that she sometimes took up two chairs. She had painfully swollen legs and ankles and was suffering fainting fits, and her doctors forbade her to attend functions at which the Queen was present (Jane Ridley comments that it seems not to have occurred to anybody that she be permitted to sit in the Queen's presence). In April 1897 she was diagnosed with a strangulated hernia. After an operation in her bedroom she recovered enough to attend the Diamond Jubilee of Queen Victoria with her husband, where she was cheered by the crowds. By October she was ill again, and died on 27 October 1897 at White Lodge after a second hernia operation. She never lived to see her daughter become Princess of Wales or Queen. She was buried on 3 November in the Royal Vault at St George's Chapel, Windsor.

Mary Adelaide Close in Kingston Vale, on the edge of Richmond Park, is believed to be named in her honour.

== Titles, styles, honours and arms ==
- 27 November 1833 – 12 June 1866: Her Royal Highness Princess Mary Adelaide of Cambridge
- 12 June 1866 – 16 December 1871: Her Royal Highness The Princess of Teck or Her Royal Highness The Princess Mary Adelaide (The Princess of Teck)
- 16 December 1871 – 27 October 1897: Her Royal Highness The Duchess of Teck

As a male-line granddaughter of the British monarch, she was styled Her Royal Highness Princess Mary Adelaide of Cambridge at birth. As the male-line granddaughter of a king of Hanover, Princess Mary Adelaide also bore the titles of Princess of Hanover and Duchess of Brunswick-Lüneburg.

=== Honours ===
United Kingdom
- CI: Companion of the Imperial Order of the Crown of India, 1 January 1878
- DStJ: Order of St John, Lady of Justice, 27 March 1896

== Ancestors ==
Ancestors of Princess Mary Adelaide of Cambridge

8. Frederick, Prince of Wales
4. George III
9. Princess Augusta of Saxe-Gotha
2. Prince Adolphus, Duke of Cambridge
10. Duke Charles Louis Frederick of Mecklenburg
5. Duchess Charlotte of Mecklenburg-Strelitz
11. Princess Elisabeth Albertine of Saxe-Hildburghausen
1. Princess Mary Adelaide of Cambridge
12. Frederick II, Landgrave of Hesse-Kassel
6. Prince Frederick of Hesse-Kassel
13. Princess Mary of Great Britain
3. Princess Augusta of Hesse-Kassel
14. Charles William, Prince of Nassau-Usingen
7. Princess Caroline of Nassau-Usingen
15. Countess Caroline Felizitas of Leiningen-Dagsburg
