= Karl Eugen von Hügel =

German politician (1805–1870)

Baron Karl Eugen von Hügel (24 May 1805 – 29 May 1870) was a German diplomat and Foreign Minister of the Kingdom of Württemberg.

== Early life ==
Karl Eugen was born on 24 May 1805 in Stuttgart, into the noble Hügel family. He was the second son of the Württemberg General and Minister of War Baron Ernst von Hügel (1774–1849), and the former Baroness Charlotte Wilhelmine Schott von Schottenstein. From his parents' marriage, his elder brother was Albert von Hügel, Royal Württemberg Chamberlain, who married Marie Louise Elisabethe von Uexküll-Gyllenband (niece of their stepmother). After his mother's death in 1805, his father married Baroness Luise Ernestine von Gemmingen-Guttenberg in 1806. They had several children, including Baroness Marie von Hügel, Baron Ludwig von Hügel, Baron Julius von Hügel, and Baron Philipp von Hügel. She was a daughter of Baron Ludwig Eberhard von Gemmingen-Guttenberg and Baroness Louise Auguste von Saint-André. After Luise Ernestine died in 1834, his father married her younger sister, Baroness Elisabeth Sophie (née von Gemmingen-Guttenberg) Cotta von Cottendorf, widow of publisher and industrial pioneer Johann Friedrich Freiherr Cotta von Cottendorf, in 1834.

Hügel studied law and political science at the Georg-August University in Göttingen (today the University of Göttingen), the Ruprecht-Karls-Universitaet in Heidelberg (today Heidelberg University) and the Eberhard Karls University in Tübingen (today the University of Tübingen). In 1825 he became a donor and a member of the Corps Baden-Württemberg in Göttingen.

== Career ==
After graduating, he joined the Ministry of Foreign Affairs of Württemberg as an attaché, which was then run by Count Joseph von Beroldingen. Beginning in 1832, Hügel was legation secretary to the Württemberg Envoy in Paris, Count Mülinen, remaining there until 1840, ultimately with the title of chargé d'affaires. From 22 October to 31 December 1840, Hügel took part in the coronation celebrations of King William III and Queen Sophie in Amsterdam as Extraordinary Plenipotentiary of King William I of Württemberg (Queen Sophie's father). In 1840, Hügel went to London as the successor to Count Karl August von Mandelsloh, where he became head of the Württemberg legation. From 4 April to 20 July 1843, Crown Prince Charles, the heir to the throne of Württemberg, visited London to learn the state of industrialization in England, and from 6 April to 14 June 1845, Hügel accompanied the Charles to the throne on his "great cavalier tour" to Vienna, Ofen, Prague, Dresden, Berlin and Altenburg. In Vienna they met with the Chancellor Klemens von Metternich. Upon the resignation of long-serving Foreign Minister Beroldingen during the Revolutions of 1848, Hügel was recalled as an Envoy from London on 10 July 1848.

In 1849, he withdrew from public life, staying at his wife's Russian estates in the Ryazan department, southeast of Moscow, away from the turbulent political and military events in Germany, which culminated in the suppression of the Baden Revolution in the summer of 1849. On 6 February 1850, Hügel took office as the Envoy of Württemberg in Berlin, serving until 1852. From 31 August 1852 to October 1855, he was Envoy of Württemberg in Vienna. His time in Vienna was marked by the political effects of the Crimean War. While Württemberg was pursuing strict neutrality, the Austrian Empire was getting closer to the Western allies' camp in Paris and London, thereby snubbing the government of the Russian Empire in Saint Petersburg. Hügel was so outraged at Austrian politics by Foreign Minister Count von Buol that from then on he was considered "persona non grata" in the Vienna State Chancellery on Ballhausplatz. He was succeeded by Adolf von Ow-Wachendorf in 1855.

=== Minister of Foreign Affairs ===
On 29 October 1855, Hügel became the new Minister of the Royal House and of Foreign Affairs under Minister-President of Joseph von Linden. In the autumn of 1857, Hügel played a key role in organizing and conducting the meeting of the two emperors in Stuttgart. The meeting took advantage of Emperor Napoleon III, unintentionally by Stuttgart, ultimately in the Second Italian War of Independence to be able to take action against Austria without fearing that Russia would intervene. In the years that followed, Hügel's policy was determined by close ties to Austria and by efforts to respond to the German question by reforming the federation that had existed since 1815 in such a way that it could have continued to exist in the long term. In August 1859, Hügel visited the ministerial colleagues Friedrich Ferdinand von Beust in Dresden and Baron Karl Ludwig von der Pfordten in Munich to discuss Federal reforms and a Federal wartime Constitution, which was supposed to give the minor states of the German Confederation an appropriate voice. On 20 October 1859, the Central States met at Frankfurt then at Würzburg from 24 to 27 November 1859 in what became known as the Würzburg Conference.

In addition to the demand for a Federal Court, the standardization of the law and of weights and measures in the federal government were also on the agenda. Hügel also played a leading role in the establishment of the Würzburg Military Conference of the Central States on 30 July 1860. The goal was a division of command over the federal contingents between Austria, Prussia and the Central States. However, the Kingdom of Prussia rejected all reform proposals. In September 1861, Beust and Hügel made a trip to Switzerland to learn about the local constitution and subsequently wrote a memorandum on the German question. Also with his Swabian compatriot, the Austrian Foreign Minister Count von Rechberg, Hügel was in a lively exchange of ideas and also maintained a friendly relationship with the Hessian Prime Minister Reinhard von Dalwigk. Following Otto von Bismarck's appointment by King Wilhelm I as Minister President and Foreign Minister, Bismarck prevented any reform of the German Confederation. When the Vienna reform program was presented at the Frankfurter Fürstentag in 1863, which Huegel also supported, Prussia rejected it. Hügel was no longer able to influence further political developments, particularly in the course of the upcoming wars of German unification.

Following the death of King William I on 25 June 1864, his son and successor, King Charles I, replaced Minister-President Joseph von Linden, and his ministers, with Baron Karl von Varnbüler und zu Hemmingen on 21 September 1864. This ended Hügel's position as head of the Foreign Ministry in Stuttgart a few years before the end of Württemberg's independence in 1871, which he had devoted his political career to maintaining.

== Personal life ==
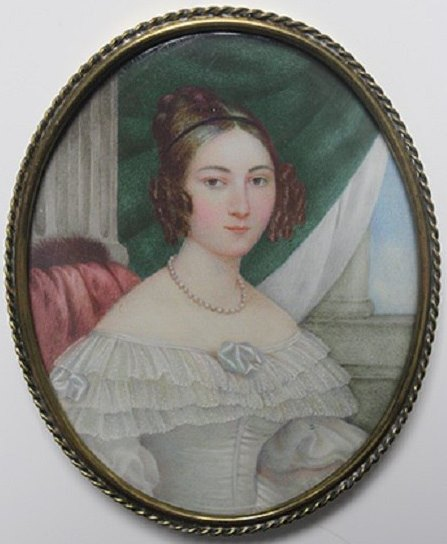
Portrait of his wife, Baroness Alexandra Mikhailovna von Hügel, 1837.

In 1837 Hügel was married to Alexandra Mikhailovna Vereshchagina (1810–1873) in Paris. From a Russian Boyar family, she was the daughter of Mikhail Petrovich Vereshchagin and Elizaveta Annenkova, and a cousin of writer Mikhail Lermontov. He met Alexandra in the salon of the Russian Ambassador Count Pozzo di Borgo in Paris. The marriage produced a son and several daughters, including:

- Baroness Elisabeth von Hügel (1838–1894), who married Baron Richard von König-Warthausen of Schloss Warthausen in 1861.
- Baroness Alexandrine von Hügel (1843–1903), who married Count Klemens Joseph Leopold von Beroldingen.
- Baron Ernst Eugen von Hügel (d. 1866), a soldier with the 8th Confederate Army who died from wounds he had suffered in a battle with Prussian troops near Tauberbischofsheim.

Hügel died on 29 May 1870 in Stuttgart. His widow died in Stuttgart in 1873.

== Honors ==
- 1852 Grand Cross of the Friedrich Order
- 1861 Grand Cross of the Order of the Württemberg Crown
- Polish Order of the White Eagle
- Russian Order of the White Eagle
- First Class of the Russian Order of Saint Anna
- First Class of the Royal Prussian Order of the Red Eagle
- Grand Cross in Diamonds of the Papal Order of Pope Pius IX
- Grand Cross of the Luxembourg Order of the Oak Crown
- Grand Cross of the Order of the Zähringer Lion
- Grand Cross of the Austrian Imperial Order of Leopold
- Grand Cross of the Hessian Order of Philip the Magnanimous
- Grand Officer of the French Legion of Honour
- Commander of the Order of the Netherlands Lion

Diplomatic posts
Preceded by Karl August von Mandelsloh	Württemberg Envoy in London; 1841–1848	Succeeded by
Preceded by Ludwig von Reinhard	Württemberg Envoy in Berlin; 1850–1852	Succeeded by Franz von Linden
Preceded by Franz von Linden	Württemberg Envoy in Vienna; 1852–1855	Succeeded by Adolf von Ow-Wachendorf
Preceded by Joseph von Linden	Foreign Minister of Württemberg; 1855–1864	Succeeded by Karl von Varnbüler
