= Annenkov =

Annenkov (Russian: Анненков) or Annenkova (Russian: Анненкова; feminine) is a Russian surname. Notable people with the surname include:

- Andriy Annenkov (born 1969), Ukrainian football player
- Boris Annenkov (1889-1927), Russian general
- Irina Annenkova (born 1999), Russian rhythmic gymnast
- Mikhail Annenkov (1835–1899), Russian nobleman, author, military officer and engineer
- Nikolay Annenkov (1899–1999), Soviet actor
- Nicholas Annenkov (1799–1865), Russian general
- Pavel Annenkov (1813–1887), Russian literary critic
- Varvara Annenkova (1795–1866), Russian poet
- Yury Annenkov, also known as Georges Annenkov, (1889–1974), Russian artist

== See also ==
- Annenkov Island, off South Georgia
