= Koenig-Warthausen =

Koenig-Warthausen or König-Warthausen is a German surname. Notable people with the surname include:

- Friedrich Karl von Koenig-Warthausen (1906–1986), German aviator and nobleman
- Richard von König-Warthausen (1830–1911), German ornithologist and nobleman
