= Joseph von Linden =

Joseph von Linden Freiherr von Linden
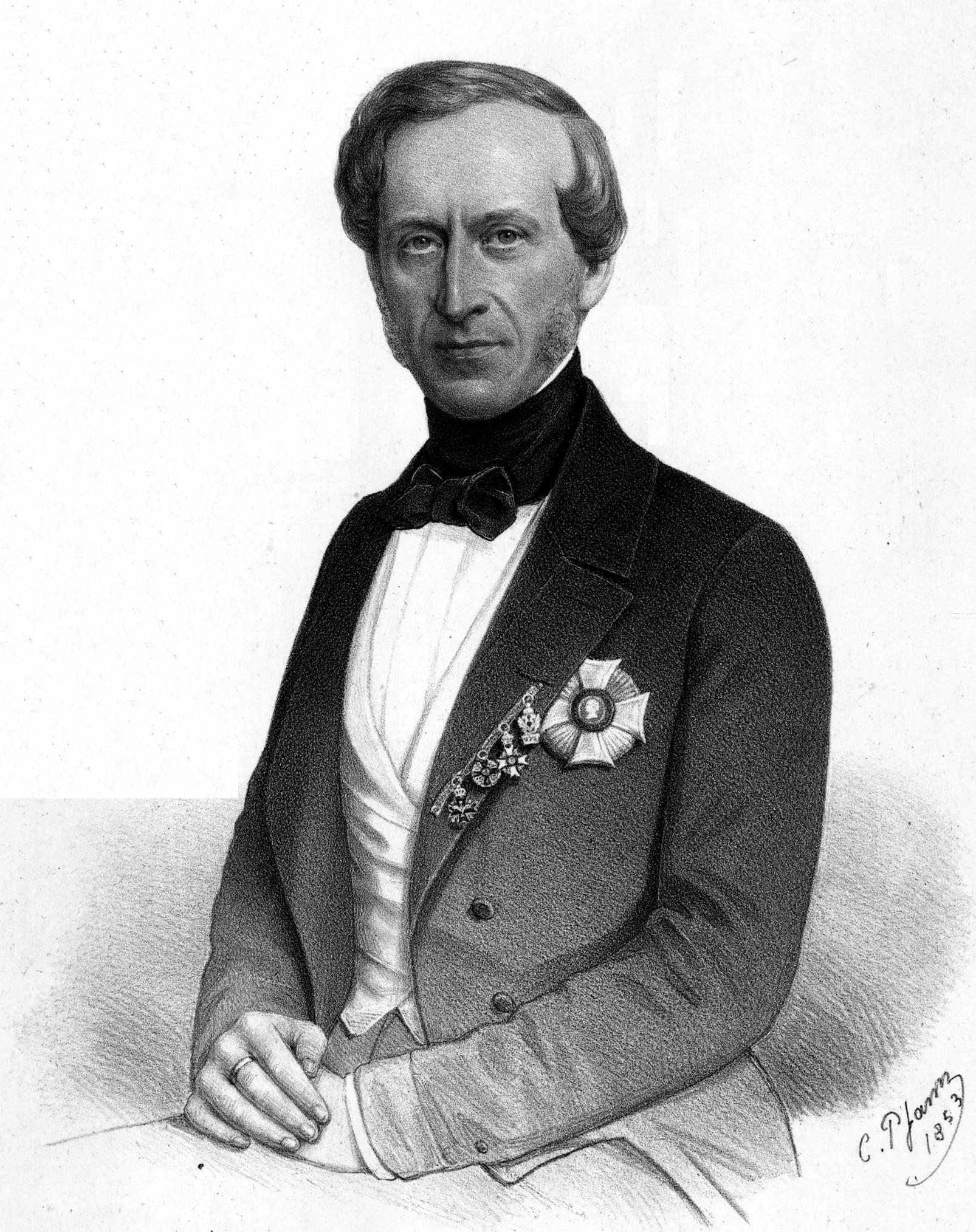
- Lithograph of Linden, by Christian Pfann, 1853

Minister-President of Württemberg
- In office 1850–1864
- Monarch: William I
- Preceded by: Johannes von Schlayer
- Succeeded by: Karl von Varnbüler

Personal details
- Born: Joseph Franz Peter von Linden; 7 June 1804 Wetzlar, Hesse
- Died: 31 May 1895 (aged 90) Freiburg im Breisgau
- Spouse: Emma von König-Warthausen
- Parent(s): Franz Josef Ignaz von Linden; Maria von Benzel
- Education: Eberhard-Ludwigs-Gymnasium

Baron Joseph Franz Peter von Linden (7 June 1804 – 31 May 1895), was a German lawyer and politician in the Württemberg civil service.

== Early life ==
Linden was born on 7 June 1804 in Wetzlar into the noble Catholic Linden family. He was one of seven sons of Baroness Maria von Benzel (1769–1805) and Franz Josef Ignaz von Linden (1760–1836), the assessor at the Imperial Chamber Court who moved to Württemberg after its abolition. Among his siblings were Count Franz von Linden (who married a daughter of Baron Ernst von Hügel), politician Carl von Linden, and the military Ludwig von Linden. His nephew, Karl von Linden, was the founder of the Linden Museum in Stuttgart.

Linden attended the Eberhard-Ludwigs-Gymnasium in Stuttgart before studying law in Tübingen. After studying in France, he was a Judge in several different Court throughout Württemberg. Linden supported his great-niece, Maria von Linden (a granddaughter of his eldest brother Edmund who died in 1865), on her way to being the first woman to study in Württemberg.

== Career ==
From 1838 to 1849, he was a member of the Second Chamber of the Estates of Württemberg as a Representative of the Knighthood. From 1842 to 1850, he held the office of President of the Catholic Church Council. In 1847, Linden was appointed a member of the Privy Council and on 1 July 1850 by King William I appointed Councilor of State and head of the Ministry of Interior. In 1850, Linden won a seat as an elected deputy in the Frankfurt Parliament, which formed in the wake of the March Revolution. On 20 September 1852, he was officially given the title of Interior Minister and remained in this function continuously until 20 September 1864. From 6 July 1850 to 8 May 1851 and, again, from 14 July 1854 Linden also headed the Ministry of Foreign Affairs until 29 October 1855 when he was succeeded by Karl Eugen von Hügel.

Although there was no official Prime Minister in Württemberg until 1876, when the Mittnacht Government was reconsolidated, those ministers who emerged as speakers in the state parliament were generally regarded by their contemporaries as primus inter pares of the Ministerial Council and the respective governments were named after these Ministers. In this sense, Linden was the successor to Johannes von Schlayer in the years 1850 to 1864 as the leading Minister of the Kingdom of Württemberg.

Linden opposed the Revolutions of 1848 and ruled conservatively and, at times, repressively in the spirit of the German Confederation. Nevertheless, he tried to convince the democratic opposition in the state parliament of the correctness of his policy. When the Diet nevertheless refused to support it, Linden dissolved it and called new elections, as in 1850 and 1855.

In order for Württemberg to be able to develop positively, he worked together with Ferdinand von Steinbeis to promote agriculture, trade and industry. The Stuttgart Stock Exchange was founded in 1861. As a Catholic in Lutheran-dominated Württemberg, he succeeded in 1862 in passing a law that changed the situation in Catholic Church to the state of Württemberg in a way that spared the kingdom the Kulturkampf that later took place in the German Empire (particularly in Prussia but also in Baden).

=== Later career ===
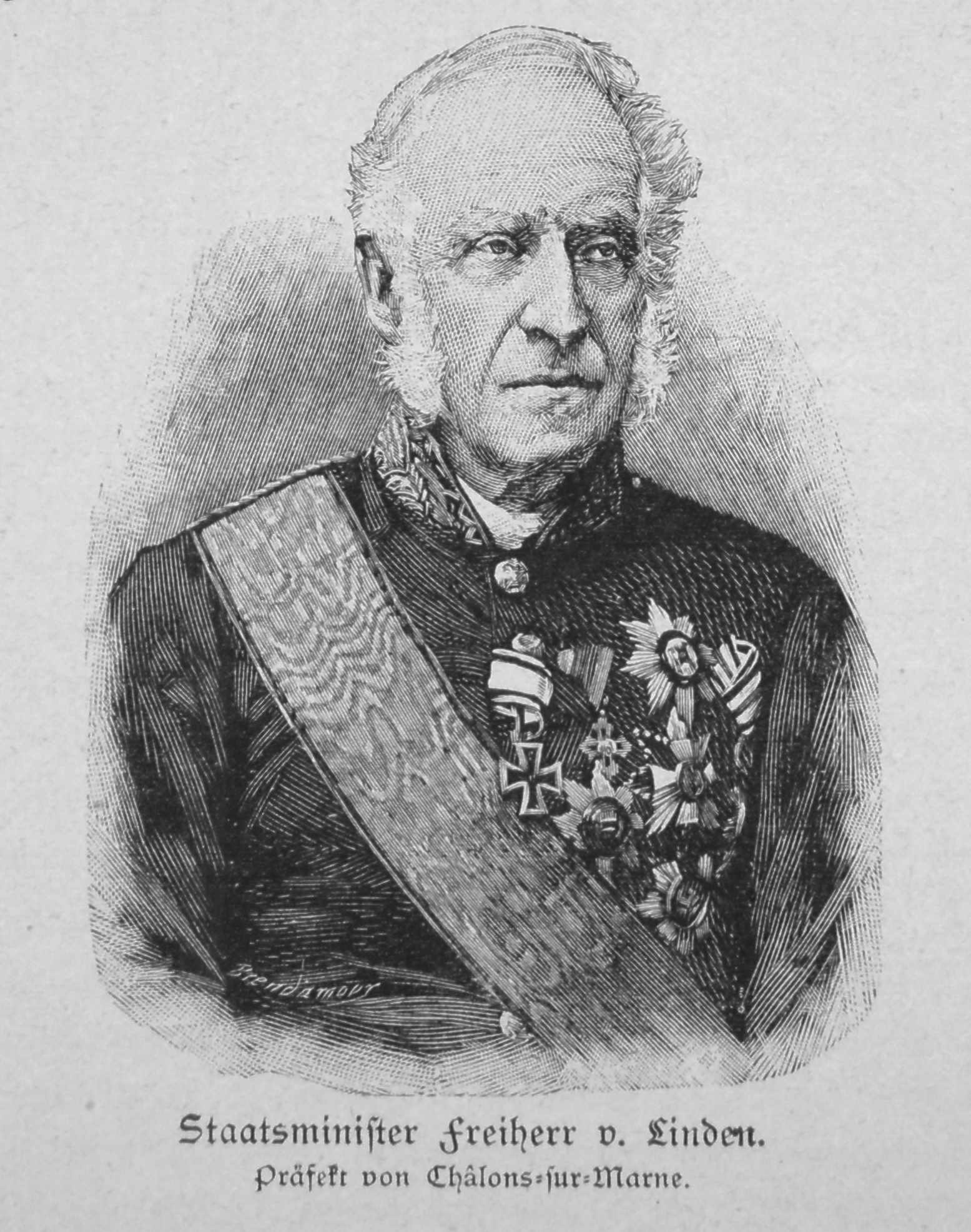
Freiherr von Linden as prefect in the Franco-Prussian War, c. 1895

Following the death of King William I on 25 June 1864, his son and successor, King Charles I, replaced Linden, and his ministers, with Baron Karl von Varnbüler und zu Hemmingen on 21 September 1864, ending the Linden Government. After Linden's dismissal as Minister by Charles I, he became Württemberg's Ambassador to the Courts of Hesse and to the Federal Convention in Frankfurt. In 1868, he was Envoy to the Berlin Customs Parliament, and in 1870, he was prefect of the occupied Marne department.

From 1867 to 1893 Linden was appointed a life member of the Chamber of Lords of the Estates of Württemberg. Together with the time as a member of the Knighthood from 1838 to 1849, and as an elected member of the Constitutional Advisory State Assembly in 1850, he was a member of the Estates for 55 years and thus the longest active member of Parliament in Württemberg's Parliamentary history. On 10 January 1893, at the age of 89, he resigned from his post due to health concerns and retired to his Neunthausen Manor in the Black Forest.

== Personal life ==
Linden married Baroness Emma von König-Warthausen (1810–1893). The couple had a son and three daughters, including:

- Baron Franz Joseph Friedrich von Linden (1831–1887)
- Baroness Emma von Linden (1833–1919), who married Franz Borgias Fridolin Schinzinger.
- Baroness Henrietta Franziska von Linden (1836–1914)
- Baroness Henrietta Josephine von Linden (1838–1881)

Linden died on 31 May 1895 in Hebsack near Freiburg im Breisgau.

Political offices
Preceded by Karl von Waechter Spittler	Foreign Affairs Minister of Württemberg; 1850–1851	Succeeded by Constantine Franz von Neurath
Preceded by Johannes von Schlayer	Interior Minister of Württemberg; 1852–1864	Succeeded by Ernst von Geßler
Preceded by Constantine Franz von Neurath	Foreign Affairs Minister of Württemberg; 1854–1855	Succeeded by Karl Eugen von Hügel
Preceded by Johannes von Schlayer	Minister-President of Württemberg; 1850–1864	Succeeded by Karl von Varnbüler
