= Gustav Biedermann Günther =

German surgeon and orthopedist

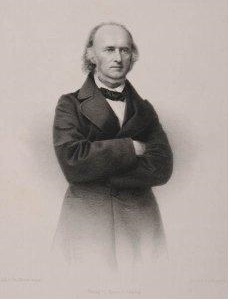
Gustav Biedermann Günther (1801–1866)

Gustav Biedermann Günther (22 January 1801 in Schandau – 8 September 1866 in Leipzig) was a German surgeon and orthopedist.

From 1818 to 1824, he studied medicine and surgery at the University of Leipzig, obtaining his doctorate with the thesis "Analecta ad anatomiam fungi medullari". While still a student, he embarked on a scientific journey with ornithologist Ludwig Thienemann to Norway and Iceland. In 1825 he began work as an assistant to Johann Karl Georg Fricke (1790–1841) in the surgical department at the general hospital in Hamburg. In 1829 he settled as a general practitioner in Hamburg, where in 1831 he founded an orthopedic institute.

In 1837 he was appointed professor of surgery at the University of Kiel and director of the Friedrichhospital. From 1841 until his death in 1866, he served as a professor of surgery at the University of Leipzig.

== Principal works ==
- Reise im Norden Europa's, vorzüglich in Island, 1820-1821, (with Friedrich August Ludwig Thienemann), 1827 - Journey to northern Europe and Iceland.
- Die chirurgische Anatomie in Abbildungen. Ein Handbuch für Studirende und ausübende Aerzte, gerichtliche Aerzte, Wundaerzte etc. three volumes, Hamburg 1840 - Surgical anatomy in pictures.
- Das Handgelenk in mechanischer, anatomischer und chirurgischer Beziehung, Hamburg 1841 - The wrist in mechanical, anatomical and surgical associations.
- Bemerkungen über die Verkrümmungen des Rückgrats und die Mittel denselben vorzubeugen, Kiel 1843 - Remarks on the curvature of the spine and means to prevent the same.
- Leitfaden zu den Operationen am menschlichen Körper. Nebst Anweisung zur Übung derselben am Leichname für praktische Wundärzte und Studirende, three volumes - Guide to operations on the human body.
- Die chirurgische Muskellehre in Abbildungen, 1850 (with artist Carl Julius Milde) - Surgical myology in pictures.
- Lehre Von Den Blutigen Operationen Am Menschlichen Körper, 1857 - Doctrine involving bloody operations on the human body.
