= Oberhof =

Oberhof may refer to:

- Oberhof, Germany, a town and resort
  - Oberhof bobsleigh, luge, and skeleton track, located in Oberhof, Germany
- Oberhof, Aargau, a village in Switzerland

== See also ==
- Oberhofen (disambiguation)
