= List of Württemberg Ambassadors in Prussia =

List of the envoys of from the Duchy, the Electorate, the Kingdom, and the Free People's State of Württemberg in Prussia, to the North German Confederation, and, lastly, to the German Empire.

== History ==
The envoys were from the Duchy of Württemberg (until 1803), the Electorate of Württemberg (until 1806), the Kingdom of Württemberg (until 1918), and the Free People's State of Württemberg in Prussia (from 1867) to the North German Confederation (from 1871), and to the German Empire. The Württemberg legation was located at 10 Voßstraße in Berlin from the end of the 19th century; the building was demolished in 1938.

In Berlin there was a Württemberg legation since the 18th century, which existed until 1933. Until 1870/71, it was responsible for Württemberg's relations with the Kingdom of Prussia, then also with the German Empire, and was the envoy of Württemberg to Berlin.

== Envoys ==
- c. 1720: Establishment of diplomatic relations
- c. 1720: Johannes Nathanael von Schunck
- c. 1730–1733: Friedrich Heinrich von Seckendorff
- 1741–1744: Johann Eberhard Georgii
- 1744–1749: Christoph Dietrich von Keller
- c. 1751–1757: Gottfried von Hochstetter
- c. 1793–1794: Tobias Faudel
- c. 1795: Reckert
- c. 1799: Johann Karl Christoph von Seckendorff
- c. 1800–1801: Ferdinand Friedrich von Nicolai
- 1801–1803: August Friedrich von Batz
- 1803–1806: Gustav Heinrich von Mylius
- 1807–c. 1811: Hans Hermann von Wimpffen
- 1811–1813: Carl Philipp von Kaufmann, Legation Counselor
- 1814–1815: Friedrich Wilhelm Carl von Scheeler
- 1815–1815: Franz Josef Ignaz von Linden, Legation secretary
- 1815–1816: August von Neuffer
- 1816–1816: Franz Josef Ignaz von Linden, Legation secretary
- 1816–1817: Gottfried Jonathan von Hartmann, Legation Secretary
- 1817–1820: Friedrich von Phull
- 1820–1820: Ulrich Lebrecht von Mandelsloh interim
- 1821–1824: Karl Friedrich Wagner, Counselor
- 1820–1825: Georg Ernst Levin von Wintzingerode
- 1825–1844: Friedrich Wilhelm von Bismarck
- 1826–1829: August von Blomberg, Counselor
- 1830–1844: Franz à Paula von Linden, Legation Counselor
- 1844–1845: Julius von Maucler
- 1846–1850: Ludwig von Reinhardt
- 1850–1852: Karl Eugen von Hügel
- 1852–1866: Franz à Paula von Linden
- 1866–1880: Friedrich Heinrich Karl Hugo von Spitzemberg
- 1881–1886: Fidel von Baur-Breitenfeld
- 1887–1889: Ferdinand von Zeppelin
- 1890–1893: Rudolf Friedrich von Moser
- 1894–1918: Theodor Axel von Varnbüler
- 1918–1924: Karl Hildenbrand
- 1924–1933: Otto Bosler
- 1933: Dissolution of the legation

== See also ==
- Politics of Baden-Württemberg
