= Hindenburg Cup =

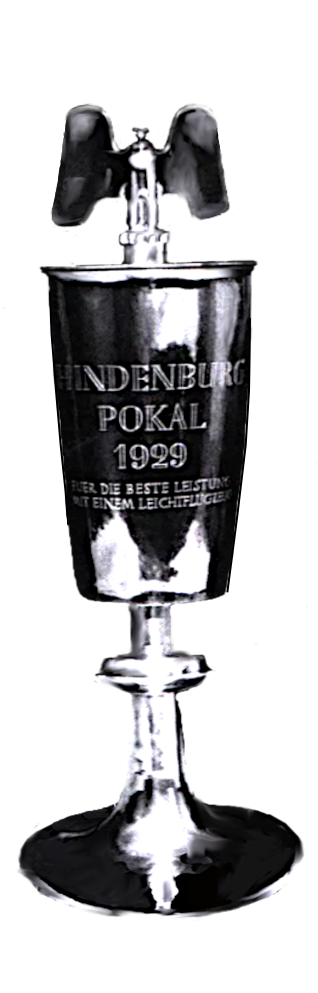
Hindenburg Cup 1929 - FEUR THE BEST PERFORMANCE WITH A LIGHT AIRCRAFT

The Hindenburg Cup (German: Hindenburg-Pokal) was a German aviation prize, founded in 1928 and awarded annually by President and Field Marshal Paul von Hindenburg to recognize achievements in powered flight. From 1930 an additional prize was also awarded for gliding.

== Winners ==
- 1928 : Friedrich Karl von Koenig-Warthausen, for his flight from Berlin to Tehran
- 1929 : Wolf Hirth, for various European flights and his flight to Iceland
- 1930 Powered flight : Henry Schlerf, for volunteer training activities
- 1930 Gliding : Robert Kronfeld, for his achievements at the 10th Rhön competition
- 1931 Powered flight : August Lauw, for his flight from Wilhelmshaven to Alexandria
- 1931 Gliding : Günther Groenhoff, for his success with the high-performance glider Fafnir
- 1932 Powered flight : Elly Beinhorn, for her flights from Germany to Africa in 1931 and to Australia in 1932
- 1932 Gliding : Wolf Hirth, for his achievements in research and thermal flight
- 1933 Powered flight : Charles Schwabe, for his flight from Böblingen to Cape Town
- 1933 Gliding : Peter Riedel, for his "great flying performance" and observations of thermal updrafts
- 1934 Powered flight : No trophy awarded
- 1934 Gliding : Heini Dittmar, for setting altitude and long-distance records

After the death of Hindenburg in 1934 the Hindenburg Cup was renamed the Adolf Hitler Prize (Adolf-Hitler-Preis).

== See also ==
- List of aviation awards
