= Gabriele von Wartensleben =

German psychologist and teacher

Countess Gabriebele von Wartensleben
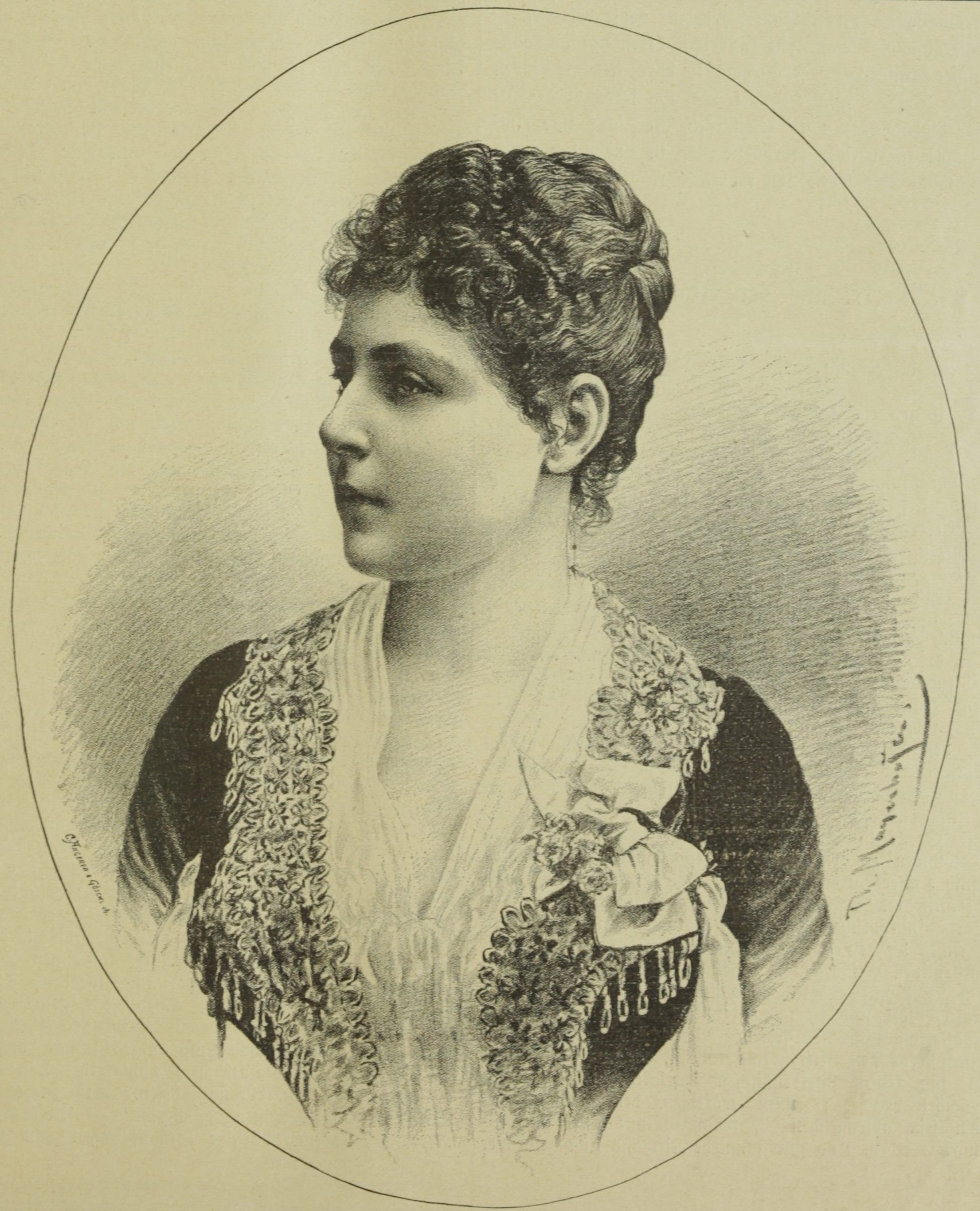
- at the age of 18 years
- Born: Gabriele Freiin von Andrian-Werburg

Gabriele von Wartensleben (24 April 1870 – 12 August 1953) was a German psychologist who published the first academic statement on Gestalt theory. She additionally was the first woman to receive a PhD in psychology from University of Vienna through an honorary degree.

== Personal life ==
Gabriele von Wartensleben was born in the Bavarian town of Ansbach on 24 April 1870. Her family was educated: her father Ferdinand Freiherr von Andrian-Werburg worked with anthropology and ethnography; her mother Cäcilie Meyerbeer was the daughter of opera composer Giacomo Meyerbeer; her brother Leopold Andrian (1875–1951) became an Austrian diplomat, author and dramatist.

Her marriage to Dr. Konrad Graf Wartensleben resulted in a son, who died at the age of twenty years. The couple was divorced in Berlin after five years in 1895.

== Education and career ==
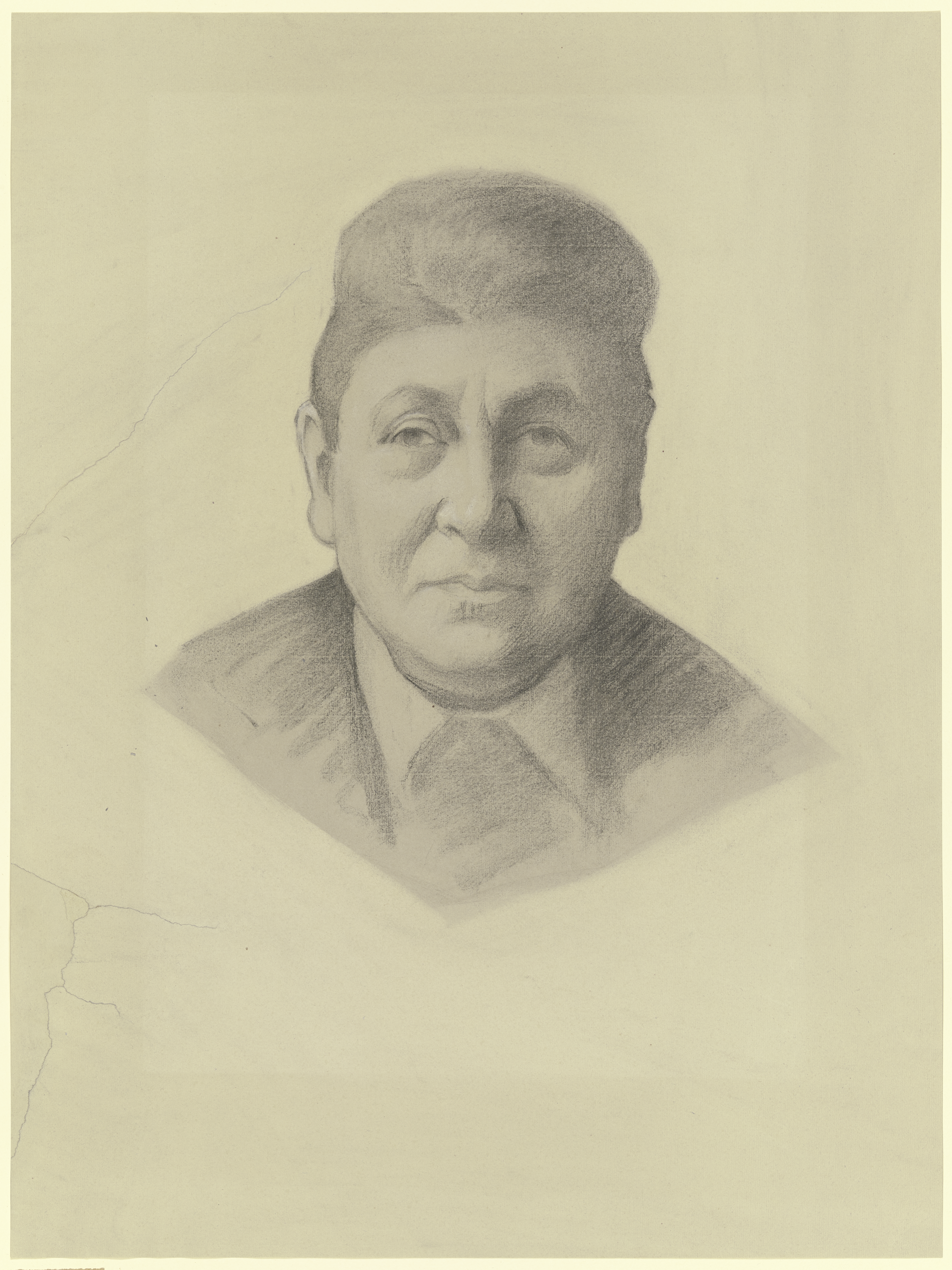
in 1937, portrayed by Ottilie Roederstein

In 1895 Gabriele von Wartensleben graduated from the University of Zurich in classical philology and classical archeology. Her doctoral thesis on the concept of the Greek chreia and contributions to the history of its form was submitted to the University of Vienna, where, on 3 May 1900, she became the first female doctoral student to receive her doctorate (without having ever studied there).

In 1913, while studying at the Frankfurt Academy for Social Sciences, she was in the spheres of Max Wertheimer and Wolfgang Köhler, two of the founders of Gestalt theory, even recruiting them for her own psychology experiments. In that same year, she graduated from the Frankfurt Academy with a doctorate and began teaching.

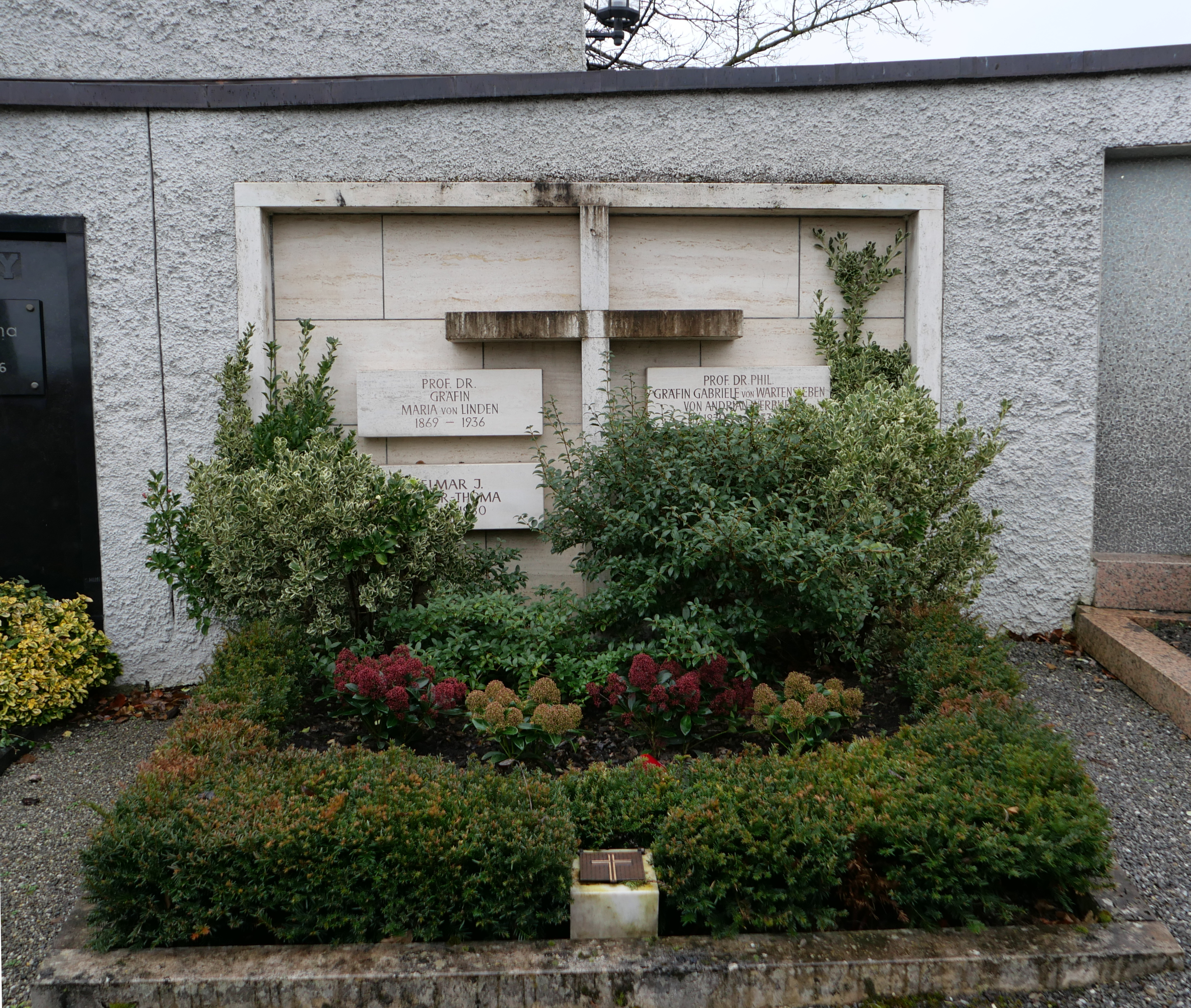
von Wartensleben's grave

In 1914 she wrote and published a long footnote in The Christian personality in the ideal image which is the first published reference to Gestalt theory.

By the mid-1920s Gabriele was teaching around Germany before moving to the principality of Liechtenstein for eight years. From 1933 until her death in 1953 she lived in the Swiss city of Basel and continued her career as an author and teacher. She was buried at the cemetery of Schaan, Liechtenstein, in the tomb of German biologist Maria von Linden (1869–1936), who was the first woman in Germany to receive the title of a professor and with whom she had a lifelong friendship.

== Selected publications ==
- Concept of Greek chreia and contributions to the history of its form. Heidelberg: Winter, 1901.
- "Contributions to the psychology of translation". In: Zeitschrift für Psychologie 57, 1910, pp. 90–115.
- "About the influence of the meantime on the reproduction of read letters". In: Zeitschrift für Psychologie 64, 1913, pp. 321–385.
- The Christian personality in the ideal image. A description of sub specie psychologica. Kempten and Munich: Kösel, 1914.
- Truthfulness and being fulfilled. Regensburg: Habbel, 1925.
