= Oberhofen =

Oberhofen may refer to several places:

- Oberhofen, Aargau, Switzerland, a former municipality
- Oberhofen Castle, Bern, Switzerland
- Oberhöfen, part of the town of Warthausen, Baden-Württemberg, Germany

== See also ==
- Oberhofen im Inntal, Innsbruck-Land, Austria, a municipality
- Oberhofen am Irrsee, Vöcklabruck, Upper Austria, a municipality
- Oberhofen am Thunersee, Bern, Switzerland, a municipality
- Oberhofen bei Kreuzlingen, Thurgau, Switzerland, a village and former municipality
