= Nicholas Annenkov =

Russian General of the Infantry (1799-1865)

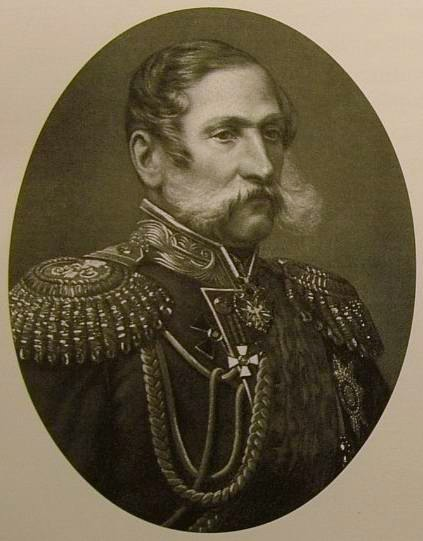
Nikolas Annenkov

General Nicholas Nikolaievich Annenkov (Russian: Никола́й Никола́евич А́нненков; December 1799 in Sergachsky Uyezd, Nizhny Novgorod Governorate – 25 November 1865 in St. Petersburg, Russia) was an influential Russian General of the Infantry, Governor-General of Kiev and Bessarabia, and member of the State Privy Council. He was the brother of prominent Russian poet, Varvara Annenkova.

== 1799–1830 ==
Born into great wealth as a member of the nobility of Nizhny Novgorod Governorate, Nicholas Annenkov was the son of Colonel Nicholas Nikanorovich Annenkov (1764–1839). After briefly attending Moscow University, he joined the Army to fight against Napoleon, thereby beginning a military career that would last the rest of his life. By his mid-20s he was appointed Aide-de-Camp to Grand Duke Mikhail Pavlovich of Russia and promoted to Colonel of the Infantry. During the Turkish Campaign of 1828, Annenkov distinguished himself and was awarded the Order of St. Anna.

== 1831–1850 ==
During the 1831 November Uprising in Poland, Annenkov served as Chief of Staff to General Baron Fabian Gottlieb von Osten-Sacken. During one attack, Annenkov routed an entire enemy division and captured 1,200 combatants. He was awarded the Order of St. George (4th Class) and appointed to Tsar Nicholas I’s personal suite.

Owing to his military successes, in 1844 Nicholas Annenkov was promoted to Adjutant General of the Infantry. On November 3, 1848, he was made a member of the State Council.

== 1851–1865 ==
In 1854, General Annenkov was appointed Interim Governor-General of New Russia and Bessarabia, a posting that coincided with the Crimean War. His actions during the Siege of Sevastopol (1854–1855) and the bombardment of Odessa resulted in further decorations: the silver medal and the light-bronze medal.

Annenkov was a co-founder, in 1856, of the Moscow-Saratov Railway with General Semyon Alexeievich Yurievich, Paul von Derwies, and the Privy Councilors M.N. Zhemchuzhnikov and Konstantin I. Arsenyev. The initial line of this railway was opened from Moscow to Kolomna on 20 July (1 August) 1862. It was reorganized as the Moscow-Ryazan Railway in 1863, and an extension to Ryazan was opened on 27 August (8 September) 1864.

From 1856 to 1862, Annenkov served as State Comptroller of the Imperial Court. In 1861 Tsar Alexander II of Russia promoted him to Full General, Order of St. Vladimir. His final posting, from 1862 to 1865, was as Governor-General of Kiev and the western provinces; however, illness cut short his service, and he retired to Nice, France, for recuperation. As a final duty to the state, General Annenkov accompanied the body of Nicholas Alexandrovich, Tsarevich of Russia, back to Russia. Although Annenkov rejoined the State Council upon returning, he died shortly thereafter.

== Family ==
General Nicholas Annenkov was married to Vera Ivanova Bukharina (1813–1902), daughter of Ivan Bukharin (1772–1858), Governor-General of Kiev (1820–22). They had five children:

- 1) General Mikhail Annenkov (1835–1899)
- 2) Elena (1837–1904), married to Ambassador Aleksandr Nelidov and mistress to Russian Minister of Finance Alexander Abaza;
- 3) Elizabeth (1840–1886), married to Viktor, prince Golytsin, Master of the Horses for the Imperial Household
  - 3a) Viktor, prince Golytsin (1860–77)
  - 3b) Sophie, princess Golytsin
  - 3c) Vera, princess Golytsyn
- 4) Maria (1844–1889), married to Karl de Struve, diplomat and Imperial Privy Councilor
  - 4a) Boris de Struve
  - 4b) Olga de Struve
  - 4c) Vera de Struve
  - 4d) Elena de Struve
  - 4e) Maria de Struve
- 5) Alexandra (1849–1914), married Vicomte Eugène-Melchior de Vogüé
  - 5a) Comte Henry de Vogüé
  - 5b) Comte Raymond de Vogüé
  - 5c) Comte Felix de Vogüé

Until their marriages, General Annenkov's daughters served as ladies-in-waiting to Empress Maria Alexandrovna.
