= Richard von König-Warthausen =

German ornithologist (1830–1911)

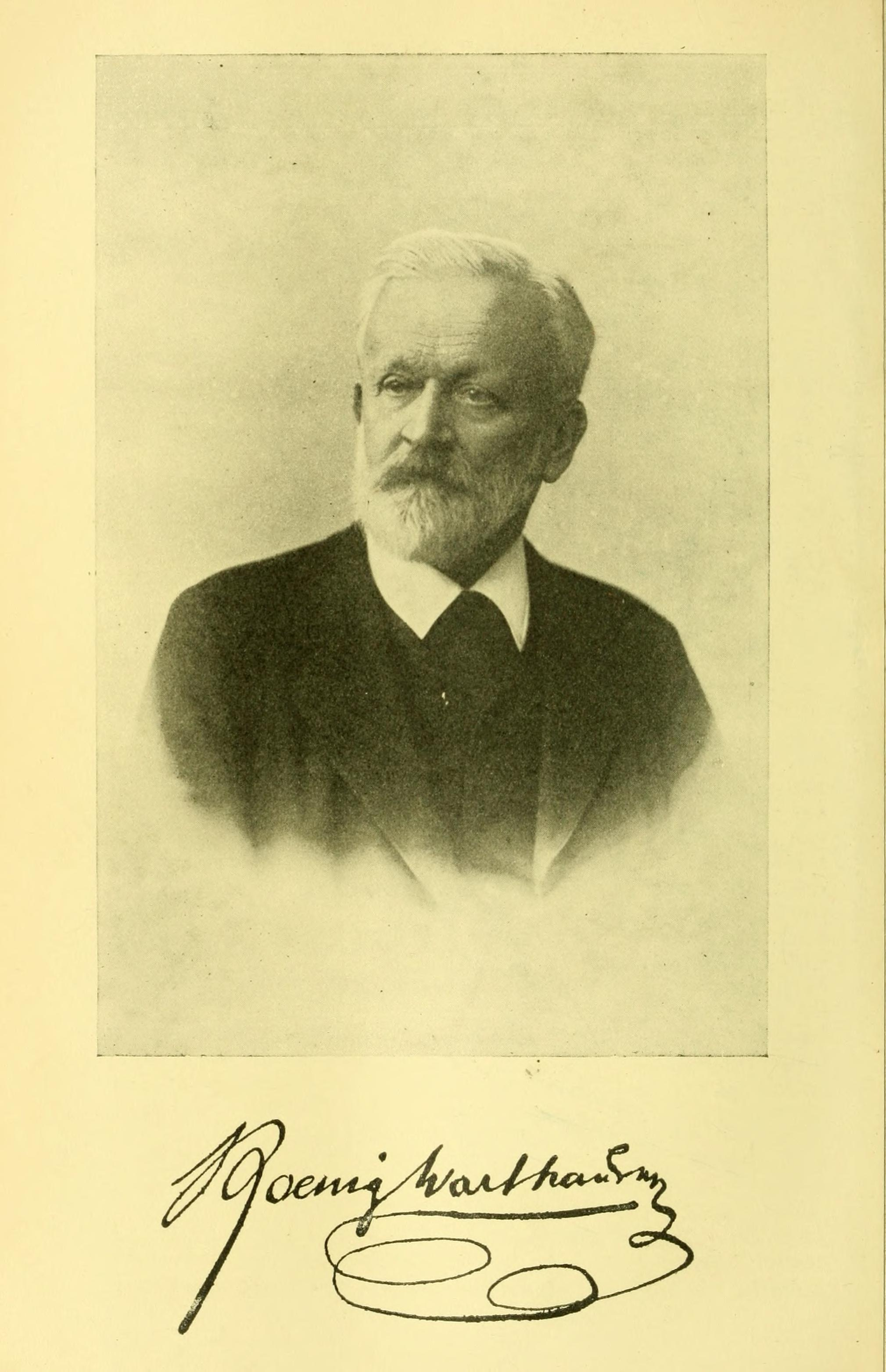
- Born: Richard Karl Wilhelm von König-Warthausen; 6 February 1830; Warthausen
- Died: 4 January 1911 (aged 80)
- Education: University of Tübingen; Forest Academy Tharandt; Agricultural Academy Hohenheim
- Spouse: Elisabeth von Hügel
- Children: 5
- Scientific career
- Fields: Ornithology, Oology

Richard Karl Wilhelm von König-Warthausen also given as (Freiherr/Baron) Richard König von und zu Warthausen (6 February 1830 – 4 January 1911) was a German nobleman and ornithologist. His collections of eggs and birds were transferred to the museum of natural history in Stuttgart in 1955.

== Early life ==
Von König-Warthausen was born in Warthausen to Württemberg chamberlain Friedrich August Karl von König-Warthausen (1800-1889) and Pauline Lembke (1805-1872). After private tuition under Christian August von Landerer he went to grammar school in Ulm followed by studies at the University of Tübingen, the Forest Academy in Tharandt and the Agricultural Academy in Hohenheim.

== Career ==
He then began to manage the Warthausen estate and at the same time began to collect bird specimens and eggs. One of his early papers was on the eggs of domesticated birds published in 1854. In his enthusiasm he had reported second-hand claims of a freak chick found inside a hen and received criticism from several reputed ornithologists of the period. He however began to correspond to many of them and continued studies on the breeding biology of several species. In 1876 he wrote on abnormal coloration of eggs. He attended the second international ornithological congress at Budapest in 1891 as a representative of Württemberg. He collaborated with several other ornithologists including Ludwig Thienemann, J. H. Blasius, Eugen von Homeyer, Reichenbach, and Cabanis while his egg collections grew with contributions from others including Theodor von Heuglin who provided him eggs of some African species.

Some early bird protection legislations in Württemberg were due to his initiative. He was awarded an honorary doctorate by the University of Tübingen and admitted fellow of the Leopoldina Academy (1898). For his supply of soldiers to the French army he received an Order of St. John and had been awarded an Iron Cross on a white ribbon. He was also made an honorary member of the Vereins für Vaterländische Naturkunde in Württemberg in 1898.

== Personal life ==
He married Elisabeth von Hügel (1838–1938), a daughter of Baron Karl Eugen von Hügel, in Hochberg in 1861 and they had five children. His niece Elise von König-Warthausen (1835–1921) became an animal rights activist.

=== Legacy ===
His collections at the castle of Sommershausen consisting of 12,500 eggs, 340 birds and other natural history objects were donated to the State Museum of Natural History, Stuttgart in 1955.
