= Maria von Linden =

German bacteriologist and zoologist

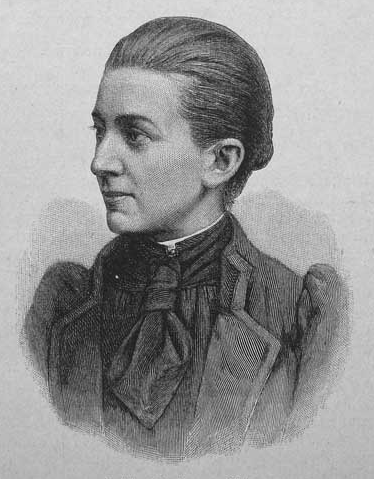
- Linden in 1894
- Born: 18 July 1869; Schloss Burgberg, near Heidenheim, Württemberg
- Died: 25 August 1936 (aged 67); Schaan, Liechtenstein
- Other names: Maria Countess von Linden; Maria Gräfin von Linden; Maria Gräfin von Linden-Aspermont; Maria von Linden-Aspermont; or Linden-Aspermont.
- Education: University of Tübingen
- Occupations: Bacteriologist and Zoologist
- Known for: First Female Professor in Germany
- Title: Countess

Maria Gräfin von Linden (18 July 1869 – 25 August 1936) was a German bacteriologist and zoologist.

She was the first woman admitted to study at the University of Tübingen, and became one of the first women in Germany to be given the academic title of "Professor". She patented a type of bandage and won a prize for her research on butterfly wings. She was driven from office due to the rise of the Nazi Party in Germany.

== Early life ==
Linden was born in 1869 to a German aristocratic family who lived at Schloss Burgberg near Heidenheim, Kingdom of Württemberg (now Baden-Württemberg). Her parents, Count Edward and Countess Eugenie von Linden, arranged for her to attend school in Karlsruhe for four years. While at school, Linden developed an interest in maths and physics. She wrote her first paper on mineral deposits in the River Hürbe read at Karlsruhe's geological society in 1890. This paper was noticed by geologist Professor von Quenstedt from the University of Tübingen.

== Career ==
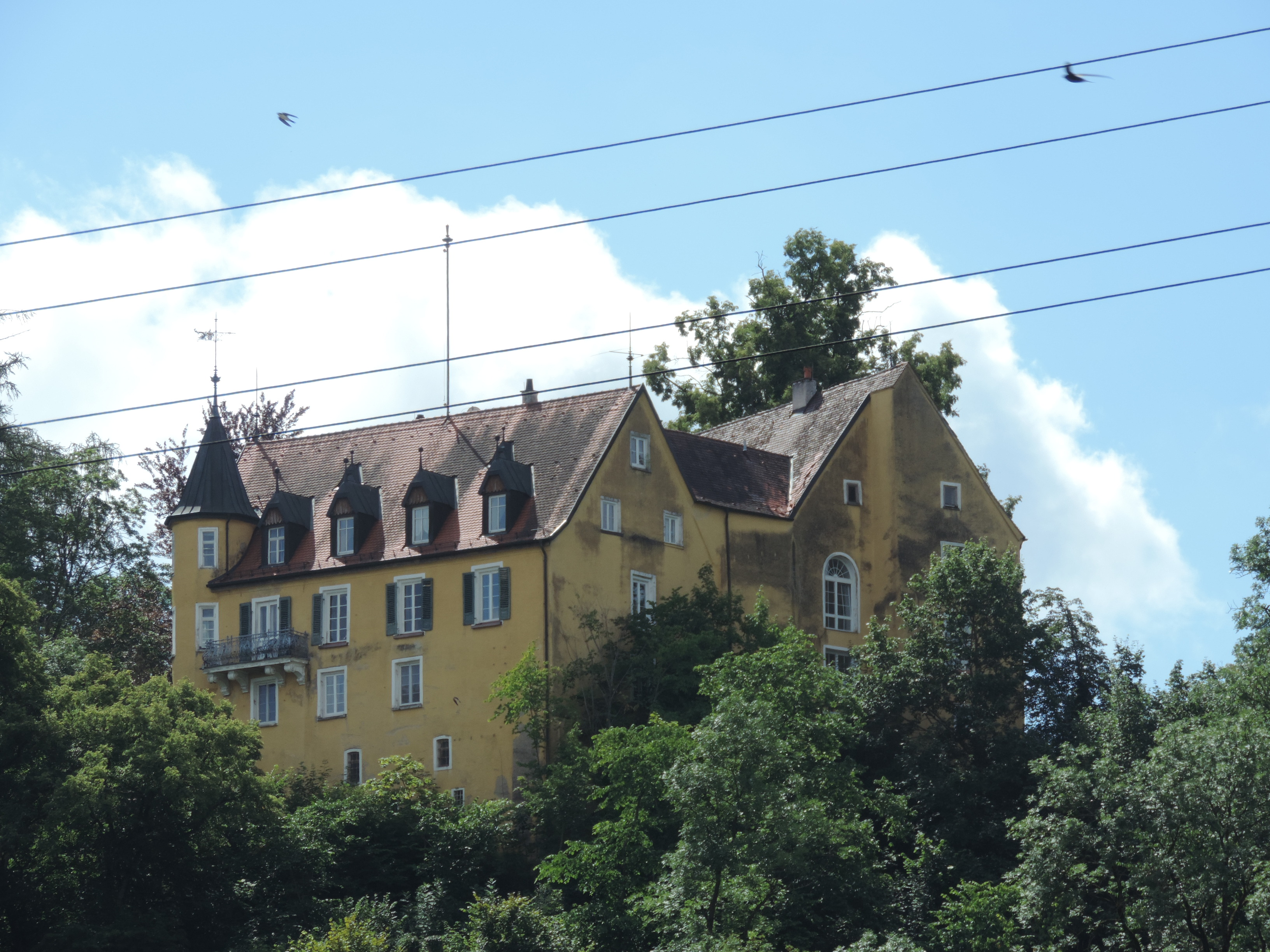
Schloss Burgberg in 2014. Linden had to sell the castle (pictured) in which she was born.

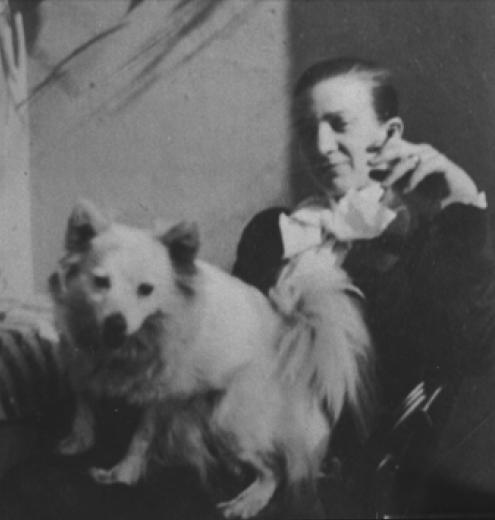
Linden with her dog in 1902

In 1891, after private tutoring and clearance from a minister, she became the first woman in the Kingdom of Württemberg to take (and pass) the "Reifeprüfung" university entrance examination. Despite her exam results and pressure from her uncle, ex-minister Joseph von Linden, she was not able to gain admittance to Eberhard Karls University of Tübingen and was forced to resume tutoring in private. However, the university allowed her to be a guest student, with her studies there being financed and supported by the German Association of Female Citizens.

She continued her study of math and physics, and wrote papers on natural history as she learned about Lamarckian evolution from the zoologist Theodor Eimer. Under Eimer's guidance, she completed her thesis in 1895; the subject of the thesis was how the evolution of snails led to the development of their shells. She was awarded a doctorate in Natural Science and worked as an assistant to Eimer until he died in 1898.

In 1900, she was appointed as an Assistant in Zoology at the University of Bonn.

In 1903, Linden was awarded the Da Gama Machado prize for her research into the development of colour in butterfly wings.

In 1908, she was appointed to lead the new Institute of Parasitology at the University of Bonn. She researched the causes and symptoms of tuberculosis and other lung diseases. She believed that copper might provide therapy for tuberculosis. While in Bonn, she took Frau von Altenburg as her companion. Linden became the first woman (or one of the first) to be made a titular professor in Germany in 1910, despite the disapproval of the Prussian Ministry of Education. Despite this rank, she was not allowed to teach.

Linden received a patent for her discovery that copper salts could be used as a disinfectant. She later worked with the Hartmann Group to incorporate copper salts into their bandaging products.

In 1928, her position at the university was downgraded to ‘assistant’.

Linden’s opposition to the Nazification of Germany meant that she was forced to leave her job. In 1933, she and Frau von Altenburg emigrated to Liechtenstein.

She sold Schloss Burgberg just before her death.

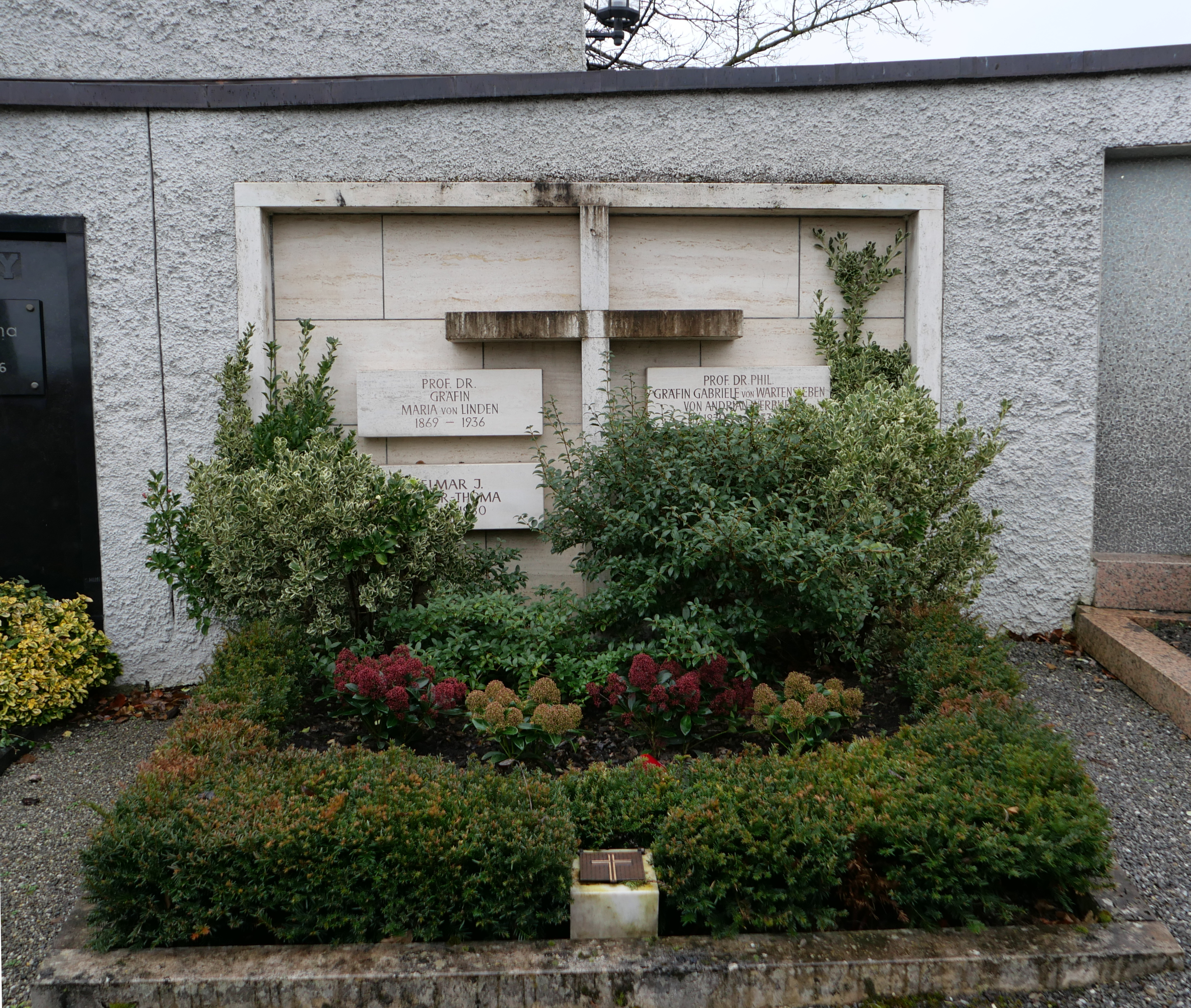
von Linden's grave.

== Death and legacy ==
Linden died of pneumonia on August 25, 1936 in Schaan, Liechtenstein. Her lifelong friend Gabriele von Wartensleben (1870–1953), a female pioneer in psychology, was later buried in the same tomb.

In 1999, a secondary school in Calw was named after her: the Maria-von-Linden-Gymnasium, a science-oriented grammar school.

In 2021, the University of Tübingen established the annual Maria von Linden Lecture, to promote women in life sciences.

== Also known as ==
Linden may also be known as: Maria Countess von Linden; Maria Gräfin von Linden; Maria Gräfin von Linden-Aspermont; Maria von Linden-Aspermont; or Linden-Aspermont.
