= Eugène-Melchior de Vogüé =

French diplomat, writer, and archaeologist (1848–1910)

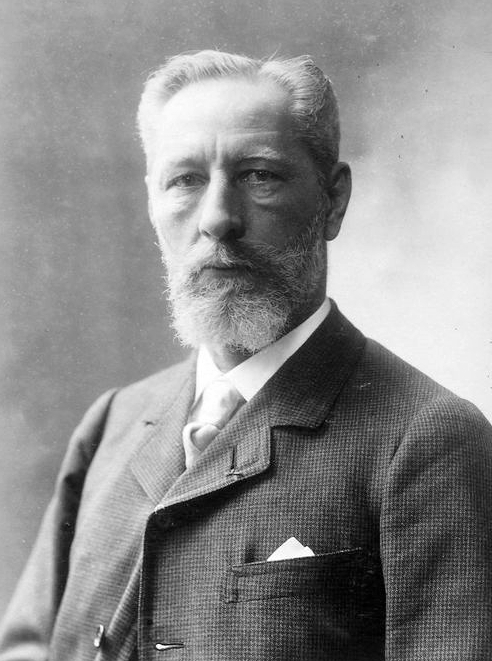
- Eugene-Melchior de Vogüé, photo by Nadar.
- Born: Marie-Eugène-Melchior de Vogüé; 25 February 1848; Nice, Kingdom of Sardinia
- Died: 29 March 1910 (aged 62); Paris, France
- Occupations: Diplomat, archaeologist, philanthropist and literary critic
- Writing career
- Notable work: The Russian Novel (1886)

Marie-Eugène-Melchior, vicomte de Vogüé (French: [øʒɛn mɛlkjɔʁ də voɡɥe]; 25 February 1848 – 29 March 1910) was a French diplomat, Orientalist, travel writer, archaeologist, philanthropist and literary critic.

A conduit of Russian literature and the Russian soul in France, he is known as the author of Le Roman russe (1886), a collection of essays on the leading Russian writers of the 19th century: Alexandre Pushkin, Nikolai Gogol, Fyodor Dostoevsky, and Leo Tolstoy.

== Biography ==
Born in Nice, France, he served in the Franco-Prussian War, and at the conclusion of the war entered the diplomatic service of the Third Republic, being appointed successively attaché to the legations in the Ottoman Empire and Egypt, then secretary to the embassy in Saint Petersburg. He resigned in 1882, and from 1893 to 1898 served as representative of Ardèche to the French National Assembly.

His connection with the Revue des deux mondes began in 1873 with his Voyage en Syrie et en Palestine, and subsequently he was a frequent contributor. He did much to awaken French interest in the intellectual life of other countries, especially of Russia, his sympathy with which was strengthened by his marriage in 1878 with a Russian lady, the sister of General Michael Nicolaivitch Annenkoff; De Vogüé was practically the first to draw French attention to Fyodor Dostoyevsky. Many consider de Vogüé's essay to be the first major examination of the novelist's work.

Eugène-Melchior was also a brother-in-law of Karl de Struve, Russian Ambassador to Japan, the United States, and the Netherlands.

He became a member of the Académie française in 1888. His uncle, Melchior de Vogüé, also served in the academy concurrently for a few years.

In 1897, he wrote a short series of books concerning the War of the Spanish Succession.

Part of his personal correspondence detailing his expedition to Cyprus, has been published.

== Works ==
- (1876). Syrie, Palestine, Mont Athos (1887 edition).
- (1877). Vangheli.
- (1879). Boulacq et Saqquarah.
- (1879). Chez les Pharaons.
- (1879). Histoires Orientales.
- (1883). Les Portraits du Siècle.
- (1884). Le Fils de Pierre le Grand.
- (1884). Mazeppa.
- (1884). Un Changement de Règne.
- (1885). Histoires d’Hiver.
- (1886). Le Roman Russe.
- (1887). Souvenirs et Visions.
- (1888). Le Portrait du Louvre.
- (1889). Remarques sur l’Exposition du Centenaire.
- (1890). Le Manteau de Joseph Olenine.
- (1891). Spectacles Contemporains.
- (1892). Regards Historiques et Littéraires.
- (1892). Heures d’Histoire.
- (1893). Cœurs Russes.
- (1893). Notes sur le Bas-Vivarais.
- (1896). Devant le Siècle.
- (1897). Jean d’Agrève.
- (1898). Histoire et Poésie.
- (1899). Les Morts qui Parlent (Scènes de la Vie Parlementaire).
- (1900). Le Rappel des Ombres.
- (1902). Pages d’Histoire.
- (1903). Le Maître de la Mer.
- (1904). Sous l’Horizon: Hommes et Choses d’Hier.
- (1905). Maxime Gorki.
- (1910). Les Routes.

Selected articles

- (1862). "Fouilles de Chypre et de Syrie. Extrait d'une lettre de M. Melchior de Vogùé à M. Renan," Revue Archéologique, Vol. 6. pp. 244-252.
- (1875). Journées de voyage en Syrie: les Îles, le Liban, Damas, Revue des Deux Mondes, Vol. 7, No. 2, 328-360.
- (1894). "Un Regard en Arrière — Les Terroristes Russes," Revue des Deux Mondes, Vol. 122.
- (1894). "Le Dernier Livre de Taine," Revue des Deux Mondes, Vol. 122.
- (1894). "À Propos d’un Débat Religieux," Revue des Deux Mondes, Vol. 123.
- (1894). "La Civilisation et les Grands Fleuves Historiques," Revue des Deux Mondes, Vol. 125.
- (1895). "Jean-Jacques Rousseau et le Cosmopolitisme Littéraire," Revue des Deux Mondes, Vol. 130.

Posthumous

- (1911). Sous les Lauriers; Éloges Académiques.
- (1932). Journal du Vicomte Eugène-Melchior de Vogüé: Paris, Saint-Pétersbourg 1877-1883.

Translated into English

- (1889). "Social Life in Russia," The Harper's Monthly.
- (1887). The Russian Novelists.
  - (1916). The Russian Novel.
- (1890). "Through the Caucasus," The Harper's Monthly.
- (1891). The Tsar and his People: or, Social Life in Russia.
  - "Social Life in Russia," pp. 1–98.
  - "Through the Caucasus," pp. 101–147.
- (1892). "The Neo-Christian Movement in France," The Harper's Monthly.
- (1895). Russian Portraits.
- (1897). "Leo XIII," The Forum.
- (1904). The Master of the Sea.
