= Leopold Andrian =

Austrian author, dramatist and diplomat (1875–1951)

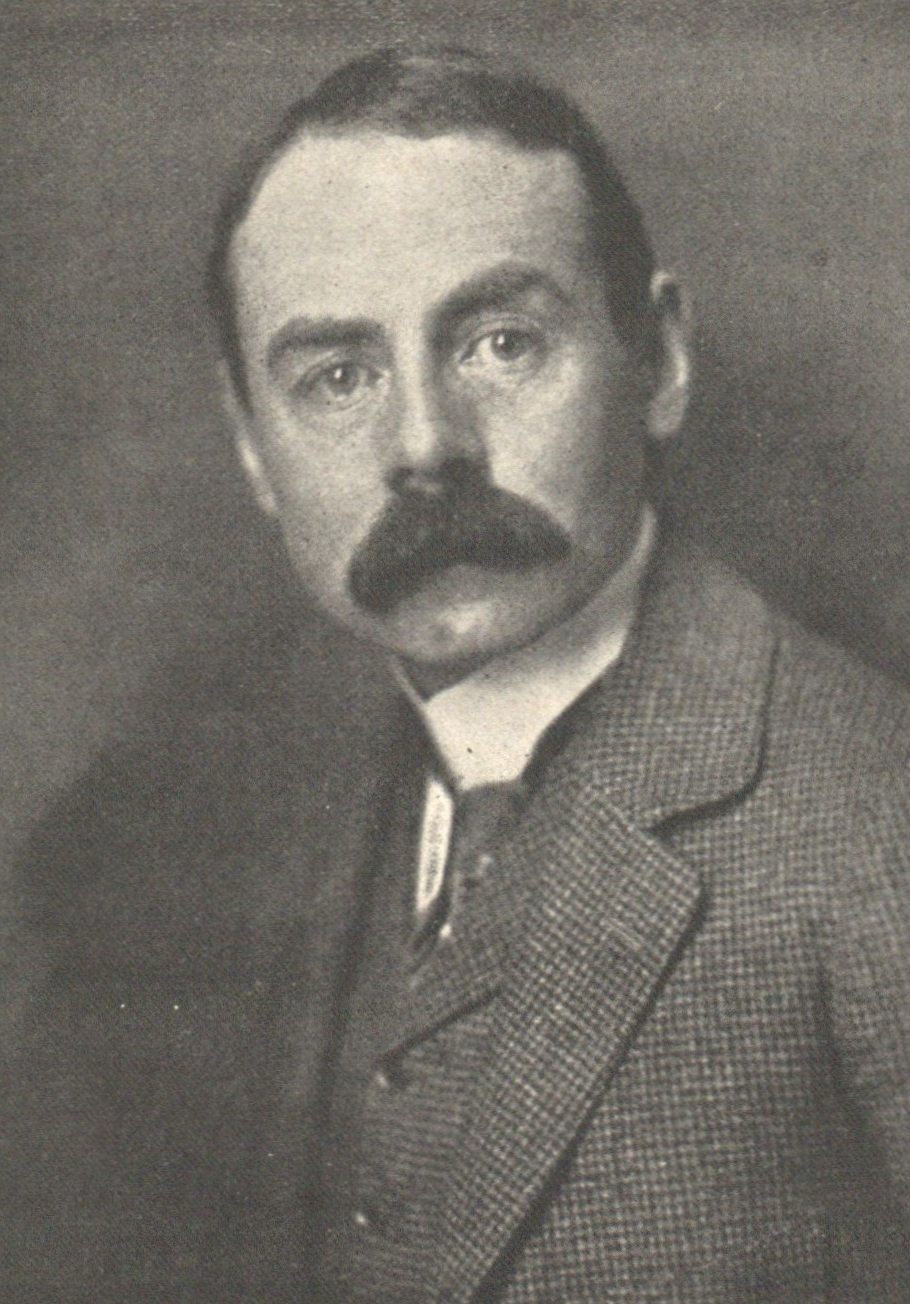
Leopold Andrian, ca. 1918

Leopold Andrian, actually Leopold Freiherr Ferdinand von Andrian zu Werburg (May 9, 1875 in Berlin − November 19, 1951 in Fribourg) was an Austrian author, dramatist and diplomat.

== Life and career ==
Andrian came from the Andrian-Werburg noble family. He was a grandson of the German Jewish opera composer Giacomo Meyerbeer and the brother of psychologist Gabriele von Wartensleben (1870-1953). Amongst his friends were Arthur Schnitzler, Stefan George and Hugo von Hofmannsthal.

After studying Law he began a diplomatic career in the Ministry of Foreign Affairs of Austria-Hungary. He became an expert for Russia and Poland and a close advisor of minister Count Leopold Berchtold. In Berchtold's order Andrian outlined the war aims of the Habsburg monarchy at the beginning of World War I.

After the war he worked for the Burgtheater in Vienna and the Salzburg Festival. He wrote especially lyrics in the style Symbolism and Impressionism.

== Works ==
- Der Garten der Erkenntnis. Erzählung. Schmidt-Dengler, Graz 1895.
- Gedichte. De Zilverdistel, Haarlem 1913.
- Das Fest der Jugend. Des Gartens der Erkenntnis erster Teil und die Jugendgedichte. Fischer, Berlin 1919.
- Die Ständeordnung des Alls. Rationales Weltbild eines katholischen Dichters. Kösel & Pustet, München 1930.
- Österreich im Prisma der Idee. Katechismus der Führenden. Schmidt-Dengler, Graz 1937.
- Das Fest der Jugend. Die Jugendgedichte und ein Sonett. Schmidt-Dengler, Graz 1948.
- Leopold Andrian und die Blätter für die Kunst. Gedichte, Briefwechsel mit Stefan George und anderes. Mit einer Einleitung hrsg. von Walter H. Perl. Hauswedell, Hamburg 1960.
- Frühe Gedichte. Walter H. Perl (ed). Hauswedell, Hamburg 1972.
- Fragmente aus "Erwin und Elmire". Joëlle Stoupy (ed). Castrum-Peregrini, Amsterdam 1993.
- Der Garten der Erkenntnis und andere Dichtungen. Dieter Sudhoff (ed). Igel, Oldenburg 2003, ISBN 3-89621-158-7.
