= Varvara Annenkova =

Russian poet; member nobility of Nizhny Novgorod (1795–1870)

Varvara Nikolaevna Annenkova (Russian: Варвара Никола́евна Анненко́ва, IPA: [vɐrˈvarə nʲɪkɐˈlajɪvnə ɐnʲɪnˈkovə]; 1795 in Nizhny Novgorod – 1866) was a Russian poet and member of the nobility of Nizhny Novgorod. Her work was influenced by close friend and mentor, poet Mikhail Lermontov.

== Family ==
Born into the wealthy Annenkov family, daughter of Colonel Nicholas Nikanorovich Annenkov (1764–1839), she was the sister of General Nicholas Annenkov and the poet Ivan Annenkov (1796–1829) and also a cousin of Ivan Annenkov, who was exiled to Siberia for his role in the Decembrist Uprising of 1825.

== Selected works ==
- For the Chosen Few, 1844
- Poems, 1854–56
- "Wonder-Yonder", 1866
- "Charlotte Corday", 1866
