= Warthausen =

- Municipality
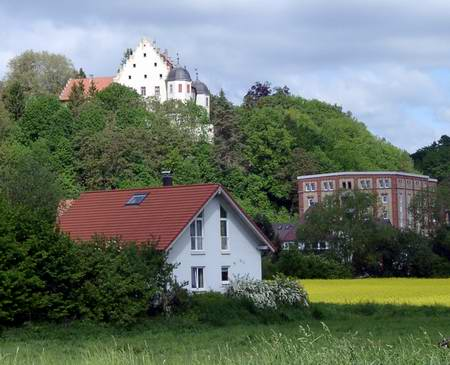
- The palace at Warthausen

- Coat of arms

- Location of Warthausen within Biberach district
- Interactive map of Warthausen
- Location within Germany Location within Baden-Württemberg
- Coordinates: 48°7′36″N 9°47′45″E
- Country: Germany
- State: Baden-Württemberg
- Admin. region: Tübingen
- District: Biberach

Government
  - Mayor (2018–26): Wolfgang Jautz

Area
  - Total: 26.00 km^{2} (10.04 sq mi)
- Elevation: 590 m (1,940 ft)

Population (2025-12-31)
  - Total: 5,337
  - Density: 205.3/km^{2} (531.6/sq mi)
- Time zone: UTC+01:00 (CET)
  - Summer (DST): UTC+02:00 (CEST)
- Postal codes: 88447
- Dialling codes: 07351
- Vehicle registration: BC
- Website: www.warthausen.de

Warthausen (German pronunciation: [ˈvaʁthaʊ̯zn̩]) is a municipality in the district of Biberach in Baden-Württemberg in Germany and birthplace of Friedrich Karl von Koenig-Warthausen. Included among its neighbourhoods is Oberhöfen, which hosts the Dorfplatz Feschd every year.

== Geographical location ==
Warthausen is located 4 kilometres (2.5 mi) north of Biberach and 38 km south of Ulm. Through the municipality flows the southern Danube tributary Riß.

== Municipality arrangement ==
The municipality Warthausen consists of the main municipality Warthausen with Oberhöfen and Röhrwangen and from the part locations Birkenhard and courtyards with Barabein, Galmutshöfen, Herrlishöfen, Rappenhof and Rißhöfen.

== Incorporations ==
On 1 January 1973 Birkenhard was incorporated to Warthausen.

The incorporation of Höfen was on 1 May 1974.

== Mayor ==
Succeeding Franz Wohnhaas who was since 1987 in office and no longer contested the election, Cai-Ullrich Fark became 2003 elected mayor of Warthausen. On October 17, 2010, he was replaced by Wolfgang Jautz (independent). With 53.73 percent of the vote to Jautz prevailed over the incumbent, who only came to 46.02 percent of the vote. The turnout was 62.9 percent.

== Council ==
The number of councilors may change by overhang mandates. The local elections on 25 May 2014 led to the following official results. The turnout was 52.8% (2009: 57.4%). The council consists of the elected honorary councilors and the mayor as chairman. The mayor is entitled to vote in the municipal council. party be right seats 2009 results

- Free Voters Association 62.3% 10 63.9%, 10 seats
- CDU 37.7% 6 36.1%, 5 seats

== Twin cities ==
Warthausen is twinned with:

- (Germany) Waldenburg, Saxony

== Economy and Infrastructure ==
=== Transport ===
Warthausen is located on the Southern Railway (Württemberg)Ulm - Friedrichshafen. Hourly trains run to Ulm and Friedrichshafen. The former railway station now serves as Button museum. Until Ulm and up to Bad Schussenried the tariff of Donau-Iller-Nahverkehrsverbund is valid. Following the motorway network via the motorway interchange Neu-Ulm is on the four-lane federal Bundesstraße 30.

== Tourism ==
In Warthausen starts the Öchsle bike trail to Ochsenhausen, the track is sometimes parallel to the Öchsle railway.

The Warthausen brewery (founded 1632, closed 1970) was known as beer supplier for up to 400 restaurants in Southern Germany. Today a nursing home is housed in the brewery building.

=== Museums ===
The Button Museum in the former station building was opened in spring 1999. The "Oechsle", a narrow-gauge museum railway, runs from May to October during the weekends.

=== Buildings ===
The Schloss Warthausen (16th century) had been in the possession of the counts of Stadion (state) since 1696. It was acquired in 1829 by Wilhelm von König-Warthausen. Since 1985 the palace and estate are owned by Franz Freiherr von Ulm zu Erbach.

== Sons and daughters of the town ==
- Franz Kober (1821–1897), professor of Catholic theology at the university of Tübingen
- Richard Freiherr Koenig and from Warthausen (1830–1911), naturalist
- Friedrich Karl Freiherr Koenig and from Warthausen (1906–1986), born at Schloss Warthausen, pilot, lawyer and author
- Karl Arnold (1901–1958), born in Herrlishöfen, politician (Centre Party, CDU), MP, MdL (Nordrhein-Westfalen), Prime Minister of North Rhine-Westphalia (1947–1956)

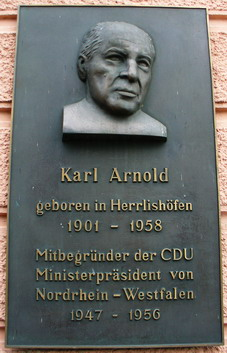
Memorial plate for Karl Arnold

- Rüdiger Vogler (born 1942), actor
- Karl Imhof, pastor and honorary citizen of Warthausen and Bedernau (Mindelheim)

== Persons who are in conjunction with the municipality ==
- CDU MP Julius Steiner (de) (1924–1997), lived in Warthausen until the 1990s.
