= Friedrich Karl von Koenig-Warthausen =

German aviator (1906–1986)

Friedrich Karl Richard Paul August Freiherr Koenig von und zu Warthausen
- Born: 2 April 1906; Warthausen, Baden-Württemberg, Germany
- Died: 15 December 1986 (aged 80); Munich, Germany
- Resting place: Niederaudorf, nr. Oberaudorf, Upper Bavaria
- Occupation: Aviator
- Known for: First solo flight around the world, August 1928 – November 1929
- Spouse(s): Anna Marie Reps (1948–1956); Sigrid Roesner (1957–1983)
- Children: 1
- Awards: Hindenburg Cup (1929)

Friedrich Karl Richard Paul August Freiherr Koenig von und zu Warthausen (2 April 1906 – 15 December 1986) was a German aviator who made the first solo flight around the world in 1928–1929. His flight took him eastwards from Berlin to Moscow, then to the Persian Gulf, across northern India and to Siam. He travelled mostly by ship to China and Japan, then across the Pacific Ocean. After flying across the United States, he again took a ship back to Europe, ending his flight in Hanover after 15 months. For this feat he was awarded the Hindenburg Cup.

== Early life and education ==
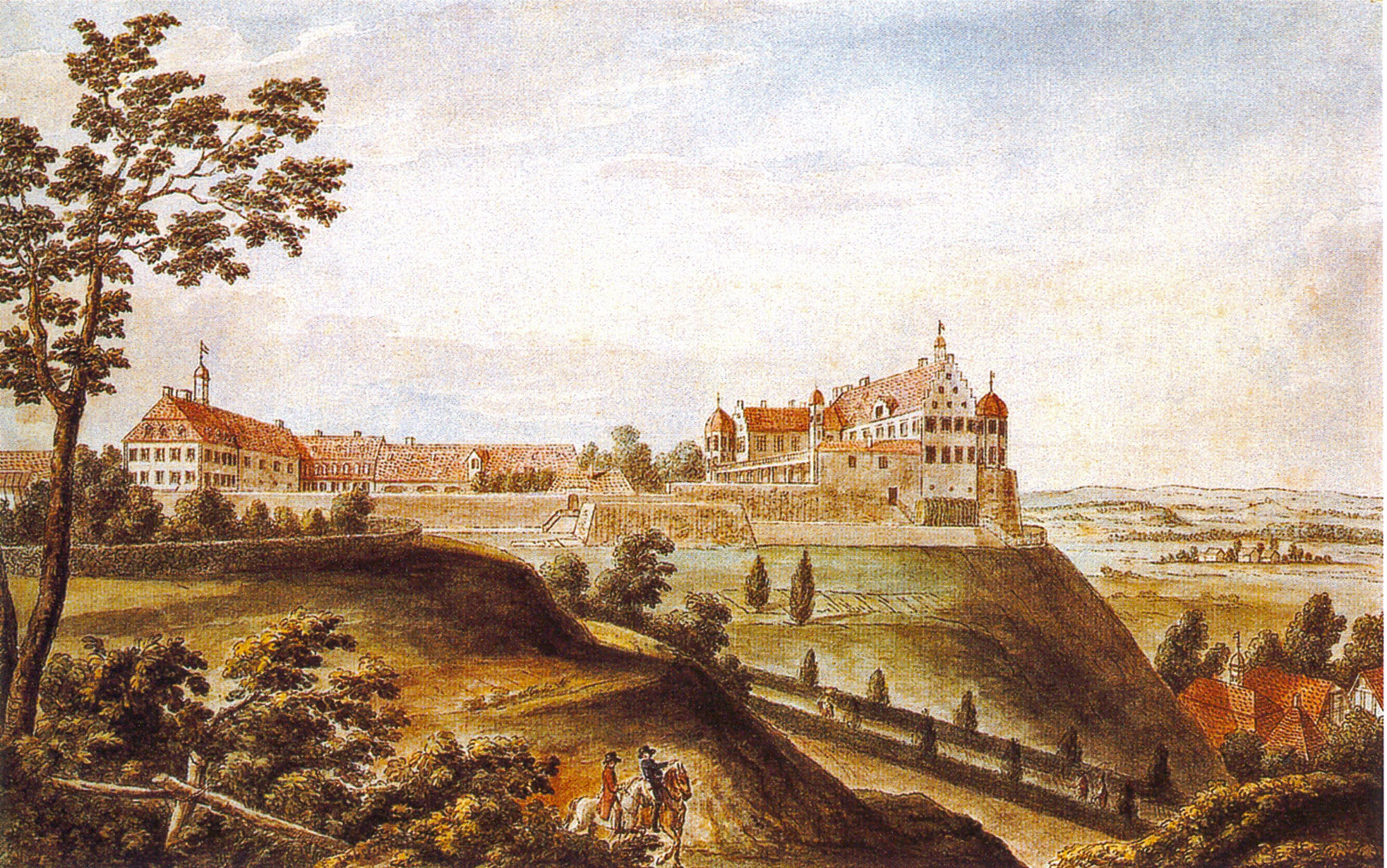
View of Schloss Warthausen by Johann Heinrich Tischbein (1781)

The eldest son of Friedrich Karl Wilhelm Freiherr Koenig von und zu Warthausen (1863–1948), and his wife Elisabeth Hedwig Marie Anna von Wiedebach und Nostiz-Jänkendorf (1878–1961), he was born at the family home of Schloss Warthausen, close to the town of Biberach an der Riss in Baden-Württemberg. He attended the Humanistisches Gymnasium boarding school in Munich, and in February 1924 graduated from the high school in Kempten, Allgäu, before studying law and economics at universities in Munich, Königsberg, Berlin, and England, while also pursuing his enthusiasm for sailing and flying, obtaining his pilot's licence after only 12 hours instruction.

== Round-the-world flight ==
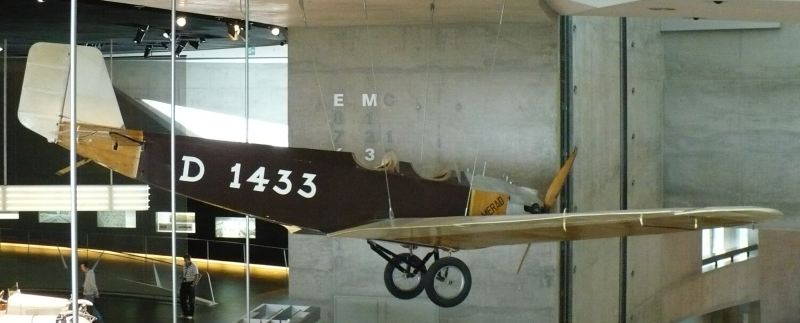
Koenig-Warthausen's Klemm L.20B aircraft on display at the Mercedes-Benz Museum, Stuttgart

In 1928 President Hindenburg announced the creation of the Hindenburg Cup, awarded annually for the best sporting flight by an amateur pilot with a prize of 10,000 Reichsmarks. Koenig-Warthausen was determined to win the prize and persuaded his parents to buy him a Klemm Daimler L.20B. This aircraft, registration number D-1433, which he named Kamerad, was a two-seater low-wing monoplane with an empty weight of only 254 kilograms (560 lb), a top speed of 105 kilometres per hour (65 mph) and landing speed of just 32 kilometres per hour (20 mph), and powered by an air-cooled, two-cylinder Daimler-Benz F-7502 boxer engine delivering only 20 hp (15 kW) This aircraft, with its high aspect ratio and very low wing loading, would today be classified as an ultralight.

Koenig-Warthausen took off from Berlin Tempelhof Airport at midnight on 9 August 1928, having less than 20 hours solo flying experience, only five of those in the Klemm. He had no intention of flying any further than Moscow and only if his fuel would take him that far.

After crossing the Berezina River, heavy rains set in, and 16 hours into the flight, he was forced to land about 50 kilometres (31 mi) short of his destination. The next morning he flew to Khodynka Aerodrome, Moscow. At the recommendation of Russia's War Minister General Semyon Budyonny, after a few days he continued his flight, heading south-east across the Caucasus to Persia, landing at Baku. Again on encouragement, this time from the German Minister to Persia, Count Friedrich-Werner Graf von der Schulenburg, he proceeded to Pahlevi and Tehran. After making it his new final destination, he flew on, via Qom, Isfahan and Shiraz, to Bushire on the Persian Gulf. A forced landing on a mountain precipice on the Isfahan-Shiraz leg resulted in a one-week delay while a take-off strip was formed with the help of 12 locals. During his long sojourn in Bushire, he received a cable informing him that he had been awarded the Hindenberg Cup for 1928. There he also met the aviator Freiherr von Hünefeld, who had completed the first Atlantic crossing from East to West only six months before, and was attempting his own circumnavigation with Swedish pilot Karl Gunnar Lindner in his Junkers W 33 named Europa. Warthausen considered von Hünefeld his greatest inspiration.

Koenig-Warthausen decided to make Karachi his new final destination before return to Germany, heading eastwards across India and stopping at Bandar-Abbas on the way. Five weeks later, on 17 December, he yet again augmented his journey with Calcutta the new target, stopping at Uterlai, Jodhpur and Agra, in order to visit the Taj Mahal, then Allahabad and Gaya, before reaching his destination on 24 December 1928. He stayed there for two months, sight-seeing, taking part in hunting trips, and travelling by mule into Tibet and Nepal. He also met Gandhi, and the poet Rabindranath Tagore.

Koenig-Warthausen left Calcutta on 5 February 1929, heading south and stopping at Akyab and Rangoon in Burma, before flying through a tropical thunderstorm to Bangkok, Siam, without the aid even of a compass. He was delayed for 10 days by monsoon rains, during which time the wife of Prajadhipok, the King of Siam, presented him with a rare Siamese cat. Koenig-Warthausen named it "Tanim", and the cat accompanied him for the rest of the journey.

In Bangkok, he encountered Jacques de Sibour and his wife Violette Selfridge, similarly then on their way to being the first couple to complete a partial aerial circumnavigation, in a de Havilland DH.60 Moth, ahead of Koenig-Warthausen. He also engaged in efforts to locate the then-missing Joseph Le Brix who had gone down on the coast of Burma near Moulmein in an attempt to break a speed record.

Koenig-Warthausen finally left Bangkok on 25 March, heading south to Prachuap Khiri Khan and Songkhla, and experiencing another tropical storm while flying over Penang before arriving at Singapore. He stayed there for three weeks, making the short flight south to cross the Equator. Having booked, and then cancelled, passage home for himself and his aircraft several times, it was only then that he decided to continue the flight around the world. Having been advised not to fly over Indochina, he travelled by ship to Shanghai, China, and then flew to Nanking.

From there Koenig-Warthausen sailed east to Kobe, Japan, where he spent ten days, and, after another three weeks in Tokyo, he sailed for the United States from Yokohama on the Siberia Maru, arriving in San Francisco via Honolulu on 8 June. His aircraft was reassembled and repaired at Alameda, where, on learning of his fellow German flyer's death, it was renamed Hünefeld on his honour.

After ten days he set off for Los Angeles. En route, a large bush fire prompted him to envision aerial firefighting using flame retardant chemicals as part of the future for aviation. In Los Angeles, he met fellow Swabian, film producer Carl Laemmle, before flying to San Diego, then Tucson, Arizona, and El Paso, Texas. At El Paso, early on the morning of 12 July, a car crashed into the taxicab taking him to the airport. He was thrown from the car, suffering a concussion, and seriously injuring his leg. He spent the next two months recuperating, and was also informed that if he could reach New York before 31 October he would win the Hindenburg Cup for 1930. He left El Paso on 15 September, but when landing at Sweetwater, Texas, his aircraft ground looped and nosed over. He was forced to wait while a complete wing and other spare parts arrived from the Aeromarine-Klemm Corp. in New York, and his aircraft was transported to Dallas, where repairs were made.

Koenig-Warthausen's next flew to St. Louis and Chicago, but after landing in Detroit on 17 October, a broken engine valve delayed him for four days. After crossing into Canada, water in his fuel forced him to land in London, Ontario, and he then flew through a snow storm on the way to Hamilton. He flew over the Niagara Falls to Buffalo, New York, then to Syracuse and Albany, eventually arriving at Roosevelt Field, Long Island, on 2 November, and just failing to win the Hindenburg Cup for a second time.

After several receptions, newspaper interviews and speeches, a meeting with his hero Charles Lindbergh at the "Quiet Birdmen Club" and a visit to Washington, D.C., Koenig-Warthausen boarded the ocean liner SS Bremen to return to Europe. After arriving in Bremerhaven he flew on, but thick fog forced him to end his flight in Hanover on 23 November 1929, 15 months after it began, having covered 20,000 miles (32,000 km) in 450 hours flying time. In Berlin he was enthusiastically received, and President von Hindenburg personally presented him with the Cup he had won the previous year.

== Later life ==
Following his flight, Koenig-Warthausen travelled widely throughout North America, promoting the German aircraft industry, before attending the University of Tübingen from 1931, studying economic and transport geography, and gaining his D.Phil. in 1934 with his dissertation on German aviation to South America. He also wrote accounts of his round the world flight, which were published in English and German.

From 1935 he worked for the airline Deutsche Luft Hansa, and also the aircraft manufacturers Weser Flugzeugbau and Focke-Achgelis. He was also a representative of the Reichsverband Deutsche Luftfahrtindustrie ("National Association of the German Aviation Industry"). During World War II he worked for the German holding company controlling the Dutch Philips company assets in Europe. In 1945 Koenig-Warthausen returned to a family estate at Sommershausen, near Biberach, where he farmed and was a member of several organisations promoting local agriculture. He sold the estate in 1973 and retired to a house overlooking Lake Maggiore, in the village of Brezzo di Bedero, Italy. Koenig-Warthausen died in Munich on 15 December 1986, and is buried at the cemetery in Niederaudorf, nr. Oberaudorf, Upper Bavaria.

Koenig-Warthausen was married twice, firstly on 22 December 1948 to Anna Marie Reps, a sculptor and writer from Bremen. They had no children and were divorced in December 1956. He then married Sigrid Roesner on 19 March 1957, with whom he had a son, Hans-Christoph Hubertus Alexander Franz-Ferdinand Friedrich Freiherr Koenig von und zu Warthausen, born on 12 April 1958.

== Publications ==
- Wings Around the World. London & New York: G. P. Putnam's Sons. 1930.
- Mit 20 PS und Leuchtpistole [With 20 HP and a Flare Pistol] (in German). Stuttgart: Deutsche Verlags-Anstalt. 1932. (reprinted by Thienemanns, Stuttgart, 1951)
- Weiter mit 20 PS! [Onwards with 20 HP!] (in German). Stuttgart: Deutsche Verlags-Anstalt. 1933. (reprinted by Thienemanns, as Wunderland und Wolkenkratzer [Wonderland and skyscrapers] Stuttgart, 1952)
- Der regelmäßige deutsche Luftverkehr nach Südamerika in seiner wirtschafts- und politisch-geographischen Bedeutung [The regular German air traffic to South America in its economic, political and geographical importance] (in German). Öhringen: Verlag der Hohenloheschen Buchhandlung. 1937.

== See also ==
- List of circumnavigations
