= Karl von Struve =

Russian nobleman and politician (1835–1907)

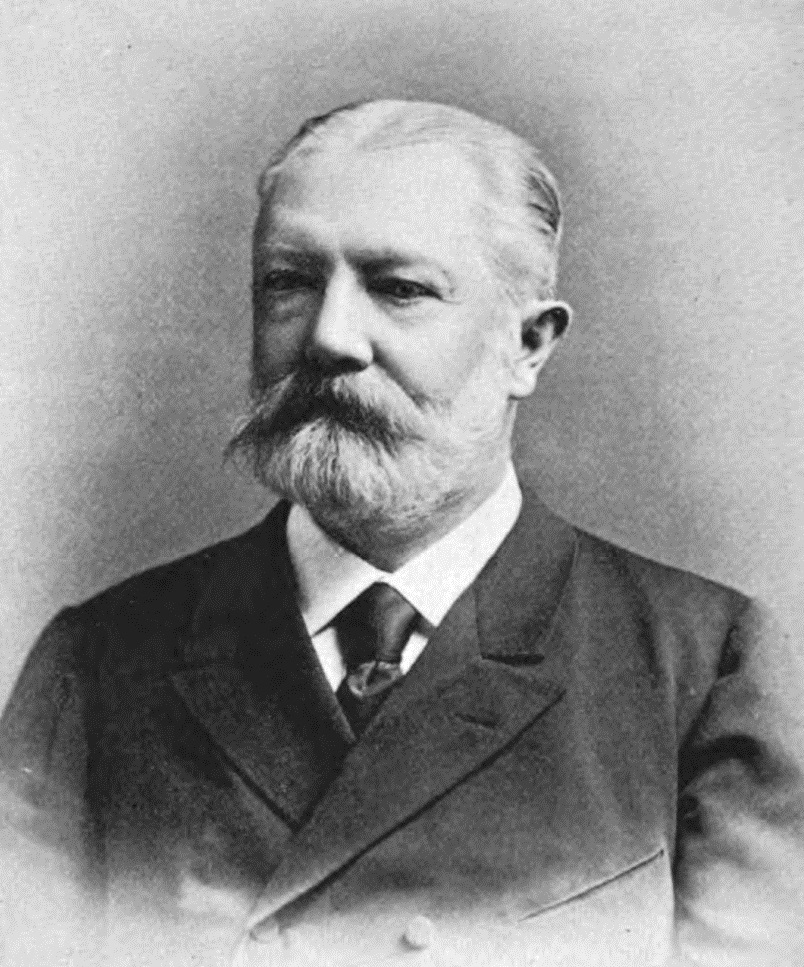
- Struve in 1891
- Born: Karl Von Struve; 26 November 1835; Dorpat, Governorate of Livonia, Russian Empire
- Died: 26 June 1907 (aged 71)
- Occupations: Diplomat; nobleman

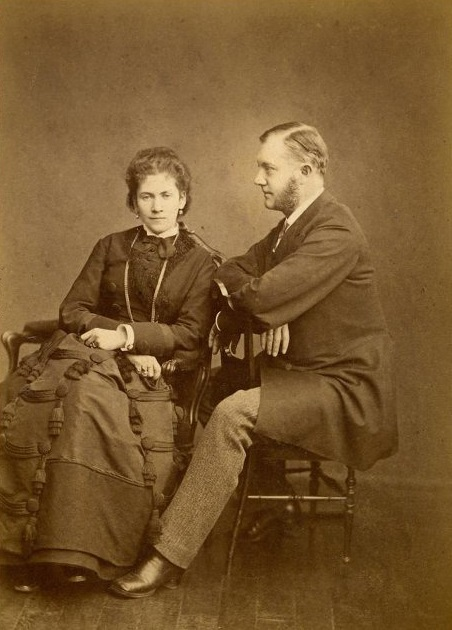
Struve with his wife, Maria Annenkova

Karl von Struve (also de Struve; Russian: Кирилл Васильевич Струве, romanized: Kirill Vasilyevich Struve; 26 November 1835 – 26 June 1907) was a Russian nobleman and politician of Baltic German descent. He served, in turn, as Russian Envoy Extraordinary and Minister Plenipotentiary to Japan, the United States, and the Netherlands.

== Early life and marriage ==
Struve was born in Dorpat (present-day Tartu, Estonia) in 1835, the son of Friedrich Georg Wilhelm von Struve (1793–1864) and his second wife, Johanna H.F. Bartels. His father was a native of Altona, Hamburg, who emigrated in 1808 to avoid conscription in the Napoleonic armies, going first to Denmark and then Russia. The elder Struve was appointed professor of astronomy and mathematics at the Imperial University of Dorpat in 1813 and director of the Dorpat Observatory in 1817. In 1835, the year of Karl's birth, he was asked by Tsar Nicholas I to supervise construction of the Pulkovo Observatory, of which he was director from 1839 to 1862.

== Diplomatic career ==
Struve's first posting as Envoy Extraordinary and Minister Plenipotentiary was to Tokyo, capital of the Japanese Empire, which under the Emperor Meiji was undergoing a rapid Westernization of its government, industry and military.

In 1882, Struve was posted as Minister to the United States. Struve and his wife were noted Washington society habitués, holding soirees and a Sunday salon for Washington's diplomatic and political elite. Their residence in Washington was in Farragut Square, near the home of United States Senator Leland Stanford of California. From 1882 to 1892, a variety of powerful men and women passed through the Struves' door: the Theodore Roosevelt, Henry Brooks Adams, James G. Blaine, Leland Stanford, and many others. The Struves were also noted collectors, donating ethnological prints of Russians to the Smithsonian Institution and a vast teapot collection (more than 900) to various European collectors. In line with German practice, he was entitled to use the title of Baron von Struve while abroad, though this was denied him while resident in Germany or Russia. The American press generally rendered his title and name as Baron de Struve.

Returning to St. Petersburg in 1892, Struve received his final diplomatic posting in 1893 when he was sent as Envoy Extraordinary and Minister Plenipotentiary to the Netherlands.

Karl von Struve died in 1907.

== Family ==
Karl von Struve was a half-brother of the astronomer Otto Wilhelm von Struve (1819–1905) and the politician Bernhard Vasilyevitch Struve (1827–1889), Imperial Privy Councilor and Governor of Perm and Astrakhan. He was a grand-uncle of Otto Struve (1897–1963), the Russian-born director of the Yerkes, McDonald and Leuschner observatories in the United States.

He married Maria Nicolaevna Annenkova, daughter of General Nicholas Annenkov and sister of General Michael Nicolaivitch Annenkoff, Elizabeth, princess Galitzine, and Alexandra, Vicomtesse de Vogüé. The Struves were the parents of five children:

- Boris de Struve – served as Russian military attache in Washington and married Eleanor Slater, from a prominent New England family, and had issue:
  - A) Boris de Struve Jr.
  - B) Elena de Struve
- Vera de Struve – married Prince Peter N. Meschersky and ran a prominent finishing school in Paris. She also served as a trustee of the Russian Red Cross and later managed a retirement home for White Russian emigres. Had issue:
  - A) Marina, Princess Mescherskaya, married 1) Count Michael Vorontsov-Dashkoff and 2) Count Ivan Shuvaloff
  - B) Nikita, Prince Meschersky
  - C) Kirill, Prince Meschersky
  - D) Nikolai, Prince Meschersky
  - E) Maria, Princess Mescherskaya
- Olga de Struve – married champagne heir Baron Peter Arnold Hermann Gottlieb Mumm von Schwarzenstein and had issue:
  - A) Elena Mumm Thornton Wilson
  - B) Olga Mumm, racing manager for Whitney heiress Dorothy Paget
  - C) Baron Godefroy Hermann von Mumm ("Brat"), manager of Mumm family vineyards, married Madeleine Allen de Casabonne and had issue:
    - a) Maria Magdalene Mumm married to Count Johan-Christian von Hatzfeldt-Doenhoff, and had issue:
      - a1) Countess Maria Magdalena von Hatzfeldt- Doenhoff married Luca Trabattoni and had issue.
      - a2) Countess Maria-Christiane von Hatzfeldt-Doenhoff married Archduke Andreas-Augustinus von Habsburg-Lothringen and had issue.
  - D) Kirill Mumm
- Elena de Struve – married 1) Hendrik, 2nd Baron Steengracht von Moyland; and 2) Count Ivan Davydovich Orlov.
- Maria de Struve – married Major General Georg Ivanovitch Chevitch and had issue:
  - A) Maria Georgievna Chevitch married to Nicholas Petrovich Balachov and had issue.
  - B) Ivan Chevitch
  - C) Kirill Chevitch (Elder Sergius)
