= Mikhail Annenkov =

Russian nobleman, author, military officer and engineer

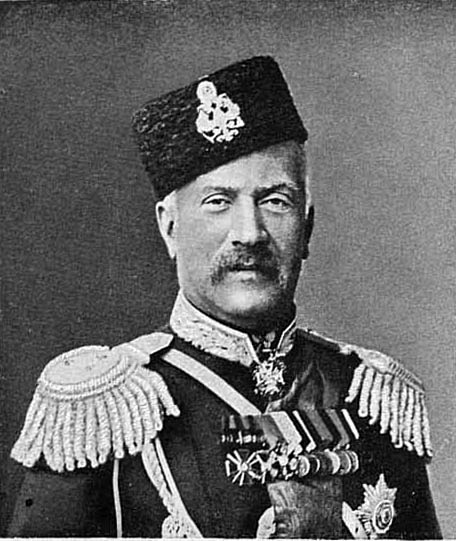
Mikhail Annenkov

General Mikhail Nikolayevich Annenkov (formerly also transcribed Michael Nicolaivitch Annenkoff; Russian: Михаи́л Никола́евич А́нненков; 1835 in St. Petersburg – January 21, 1899 in St. Petersburg) was a Russian nobleman, author, military officer, and engineer. An important figure in the history of the Russian conquest of Turkestan in the 19th century, he was Governor-General of the Transcaspian Region (today's Turkmenistan).

General Annenkov was the builder of the strategic Transcaspian Railway in its initial stages through what is now Turkmenistan, which made possible the bloody defeat of the Turkmen at Geok-Tepe in 1881. He was also involved in the planning of the Trans-Siberian railroad, which was under construction at the time of his death.

He also played a major role in the Pendjeh Crisis of 1885, when the UK and Russia nearly went to war.

== Education and early career ==
Born into the wealthy Annenkoff family, son of General Nicholas Annenkov, Governor of Odessa and the southwestern provinces and aide-de-camp to the Emperor, Michael studied at the Corps des Pages and was appointed general adjutant to the general staff of the Imperial Army at St. Petersburg. From 1864 to 1866, during the Polish uprising, Michael earned a reputation as a competent commander and military tactician: by age 27 he had been made a Colonel of the Imperial Army and appointed Aide-de-Camp to Emperor Alexander III of Russia.

In the 1870s, Michael served as Military Attaché to Germany, during the Franco-Prussian War, and then later to France. His writings on German military tactics during the war were widely read. By 1878 he had been appointed a Lieutenant-General of the Imperial Army. During the Russo-Turkish War (1877–1878) General Annenkoff was placed in charge of transportation, learning the valuable skills that would later make him one of the most prominent engineers of his era. He was awarded Serbian Order of the Cross of Takovo.

== Central Asia ==
In the 1880s, General Annenkoff served on several campaigns in Central Asia, most notably against the Turkmen population (serving under General Mikhail Skobelev in the Merv campaign). In order to move troops and supplies, he supervised construction of the Trans-Caspian Railway. The original portion was opened in 1881 from Uzun-Ada on the Caspian Sea to Kyzyl Aryat (now Serdar in Turkmenistan). The line was opened to Ashkabad (now Ashgabat) in December 1885 and to Merv (modern Mary, Turkmenistan) in July 1886. The next section (which reached Bukhara by an 8-mile branch) was completed to Samarkand (in what is now Uzbekistan) in May 1888. He completed laying more than 1,000 miles of track in less than three years (1885–1888), which brought him immediate engineering fame. (The western terminus was later changed to Krasnovodsk.) He was honored by scientific bodies throughout Europe, including being appointed a vice-president of the International Congress of Geography (1891). He later became a planner and chief promoter of the Trans-Siberian railroad.

General Annenkoff was involved in the annexation of the Emirate of Bukhara as a client state of the Czar. Upon the death of Emir Mozaffar al-Din in 1885, General Annenkoff marched into Bukhara and put Emir's younger son on the throne. The Russian troops that were left behind placed the Emirate of Bukhara under control of the Russian Empire.

In 1892 Annenkoff was promoted to General of Infantry and given charge of the construction of the extension of the Trans-Caspian Railway, which in 1898 reached Tashkent with a branch to Andijan

== Family ==
Most prominent of General Annenkoff's sisters were Madame Marie de Struve, wife of Karl de Struve, Russian Ambassador to Japan, the United States, and the Netherlands respectively, Elizabeth, princess Galitzine, and Alexandra, Vicomtesse de Vogüé, wife of French critic and author Vicomte Eugène-Melchior de Vogüé. In 1878 the Vicomte de Vogüé and Miss Alexandra N. Annenkova were married at the Winter Palace, St. Petersburg. After his first marriage to Baroness Alexandra Zubova ended, in 1883 General Annenkov married Dagmar Elisabeth von Oesterreich (19 years old). The marriage was dissolved in 1889.

General Michael N. Annenkoff died in St. Petersburg on 9 (21 New Style) January 1899, reportedly by suicide. There was suspicion that he had misappropriated funds from the Trans-Caspian Railway. At the time, he was a member of the Imperial Military Council in St. Petersburg.

== Notes ==
- Ген. М.A. Анненков "Ахал-Техинский Оазис и Пути к Индии" (The Akhal-Teki Oasis and the roads to India) (С.Пб.) 1881
- Ген-Лт.М.А.Терентьев "История Завоевания Средней Азии" (The History of the Conquest of Central Asia) (С.Пб.) 1906 3 Vols
