= Schloss Warthausen =

Schloss (large country palace) near the town of Warthausen in Germany

Coordinates: 48°7′51″N 9°47′34″E

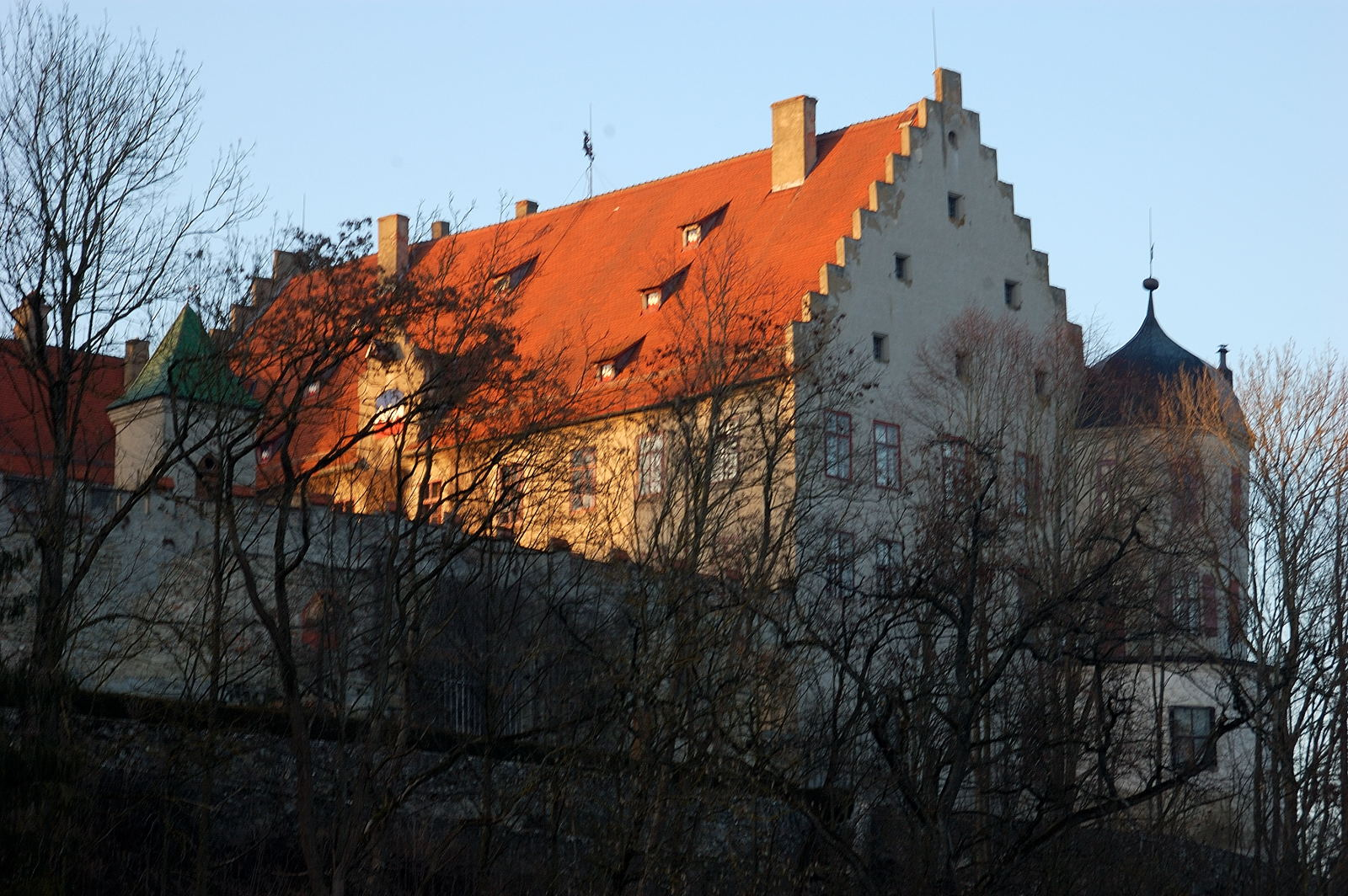
Schloss Warthausen close-up in 2008

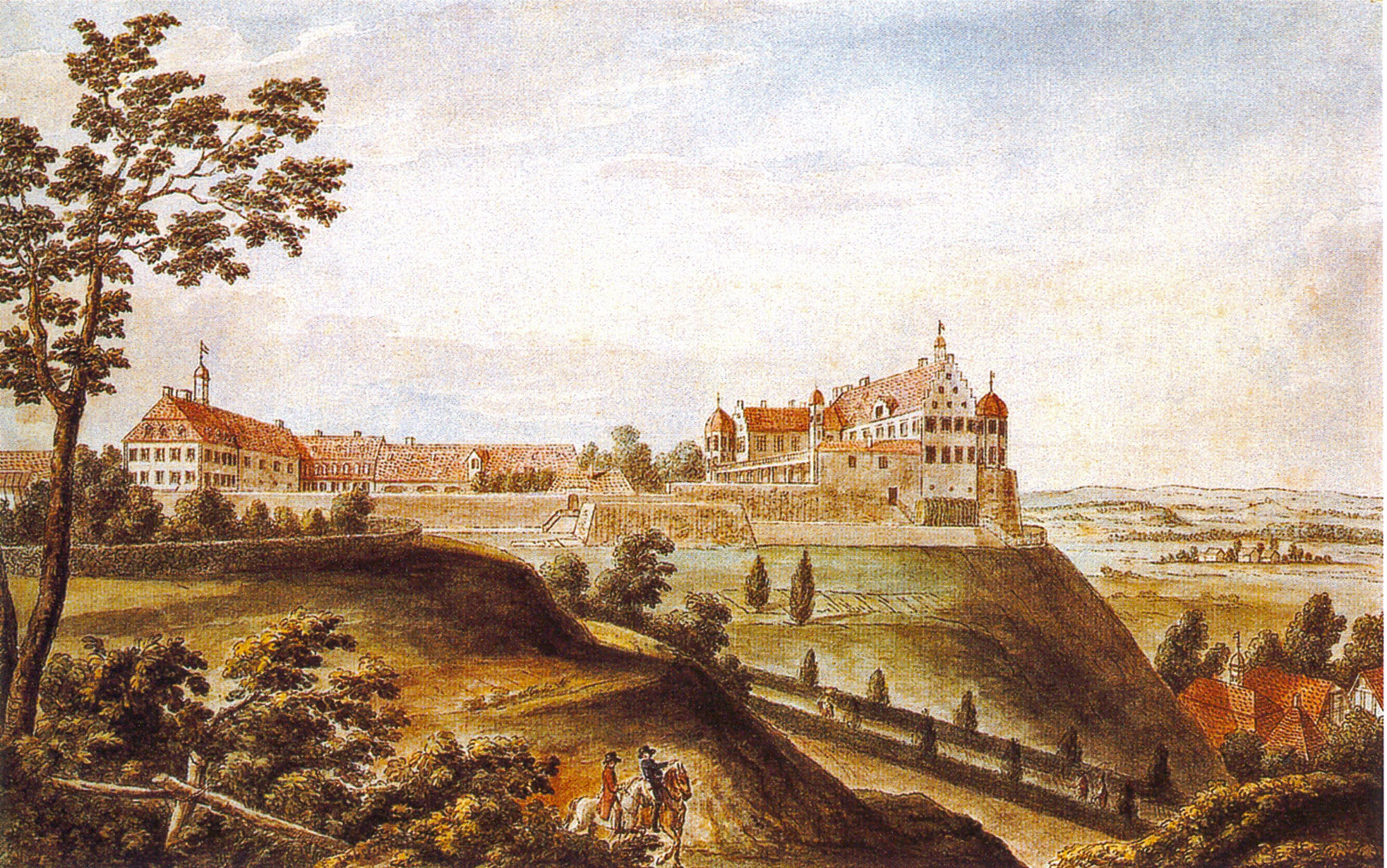
View of Schloss Warthausen by Johann Heinrich Tischbein (1781)

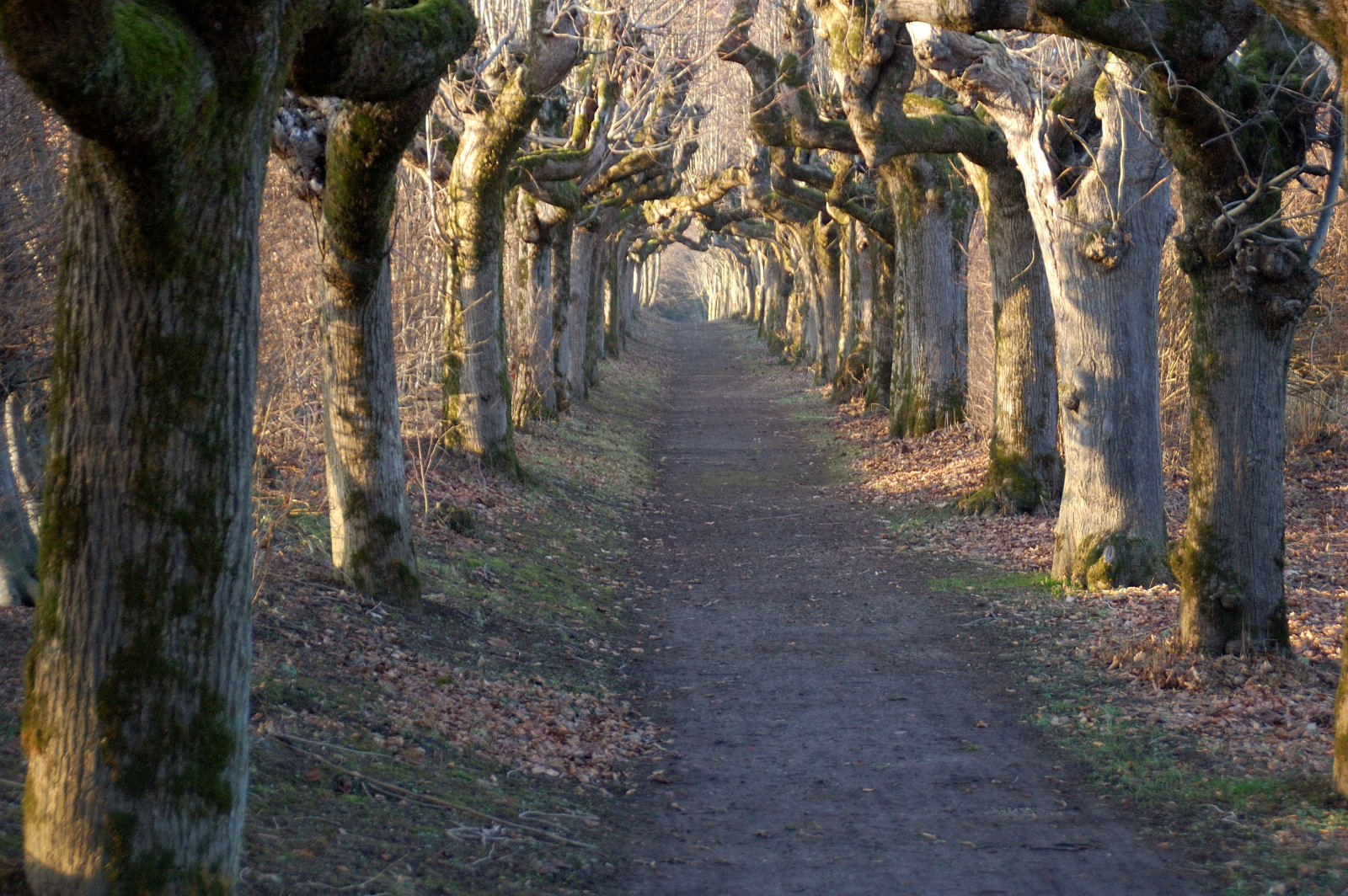
Tree allee

Schloss Warthausen (Warthausen palace) is a schloss (large country palace) near the town of Warthausen in Germany. It has been home to several famous historical personages, including authors Christoph Martin Wieland and Sophie von La Roche, and painter Johann Heinrich Tischbein. It was the traditional home of the Counts of Stadion-Warthausen. It is the subject of an article, The Gardens at Schloss Warthausen and Their Place in German Literature.

== History ==
In 1168, a castle was sold to Friedrich Barbarossa, and passed to the House of Habsburg in 1339. The castle burned down in 1474, and was rebuilt.

In 1529, Reichsritter Dr. Hans Schad von Mittelbiberach (1505-1571) received the building from the House of Habsburg, adding new construction to it between 1532 and 1540, enlarging it to a country palace. It was burned again in 1623, during the Thirty Years' War, and rebuilt in the Renaissance style in the 1620s.

From 1696 to 1827, Schloss Warthausen was in the possession of the Counts of Stadion. The State of Württemberg took possession of it and its hereditary rights in 1827. In 1829, it was acquired by Wilhelm von König-Warthausen.

It has been home to many notable historical personages, including Count Anton Heinrich Friedrich von Stadion, Johann Philipp Stadion, Count von Warthausen, Christoph Martin Wieland, Johann Heinrich Tischbein, Sophie von La Roche, Richard von König-Warthausen, and Friedrich Karl von Koenig-Warthausen.

Since 1985, the building and its surrounding lands have been owned by Franz Freiherr von Ulm zu Erbach.
