= Oberhöfen =

Oberhöfen is a small part of a town called Warthausen, in eastern Baden-Württemberg, Germany.
