= Ludwig Thienemann =

German physician and naturalist

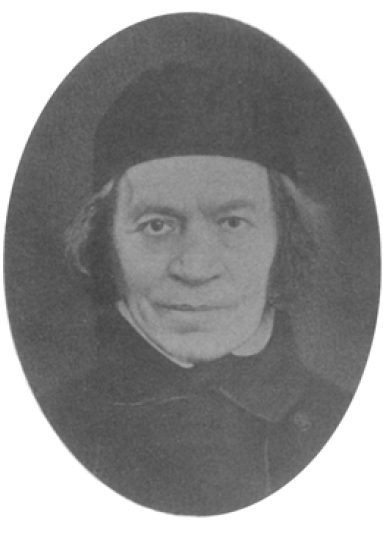
Ludwig Thienemann

Friedrich August Ludwig Thienemann ( 25 December 1793, Freyburg – 24 June 1858, Dresden) was a German medical doctor and naturalist.

Ludwig Thienemann was the son of Johann August Thienemann (1749–1812) and Johanne Eleonora Friederike née Schreiber (1757–1809). He graduated as a doctor in 1819 and then travelled in Europe for two years, spending thirteen months in Iceland. He published a report on his travel in 1824–1827.

In 1822, he moved to Leipzig, where he taught zoology in the university and he became curator the natural history collections in Dresden (Kustos Naturalien- sammlungen now in Staatliches Museum für Tierkunde Dresden) in 1825. He was the founder of the ornithological newspaper Rhea, whose two numbers appeared in 1846 and in 1849.

He is best remembered for his work in ornithology, in particular research involving avian reproduction. During his career, he amassed a collection of 2000 bird nests and 5000 eggs from 1200 species.

== Works ==
With Christian Ludwig Brehm, he collaborated on "Systematische Darstellung der Fortpflanzung der Vögel Europa's mit Abbildung der Eier" (Systematic representation of the reproduction of birds of Europe with illustration of eggs), published in five volumes (1825–1938). He later published his most famous work, titled "Fortpflanzungsgeschichte der gesammten Vögel nach dem gegenwärtigen Standpunkte der Wissenschaft" (Reproductive history of birds from a standpoint of current science), issued in ten parts from 1845 to 1856.

- 1828 Lehrbuch der Zoologie.
- 1845 Einhundert Tafeln colorirter Abbildungen on Vogeleiern. Zur Fortpflanzungsgeschichte der gesammten Vögel.
