= Insular G =

Form of the letter g in Insular script

- Ᵹ ᵹ
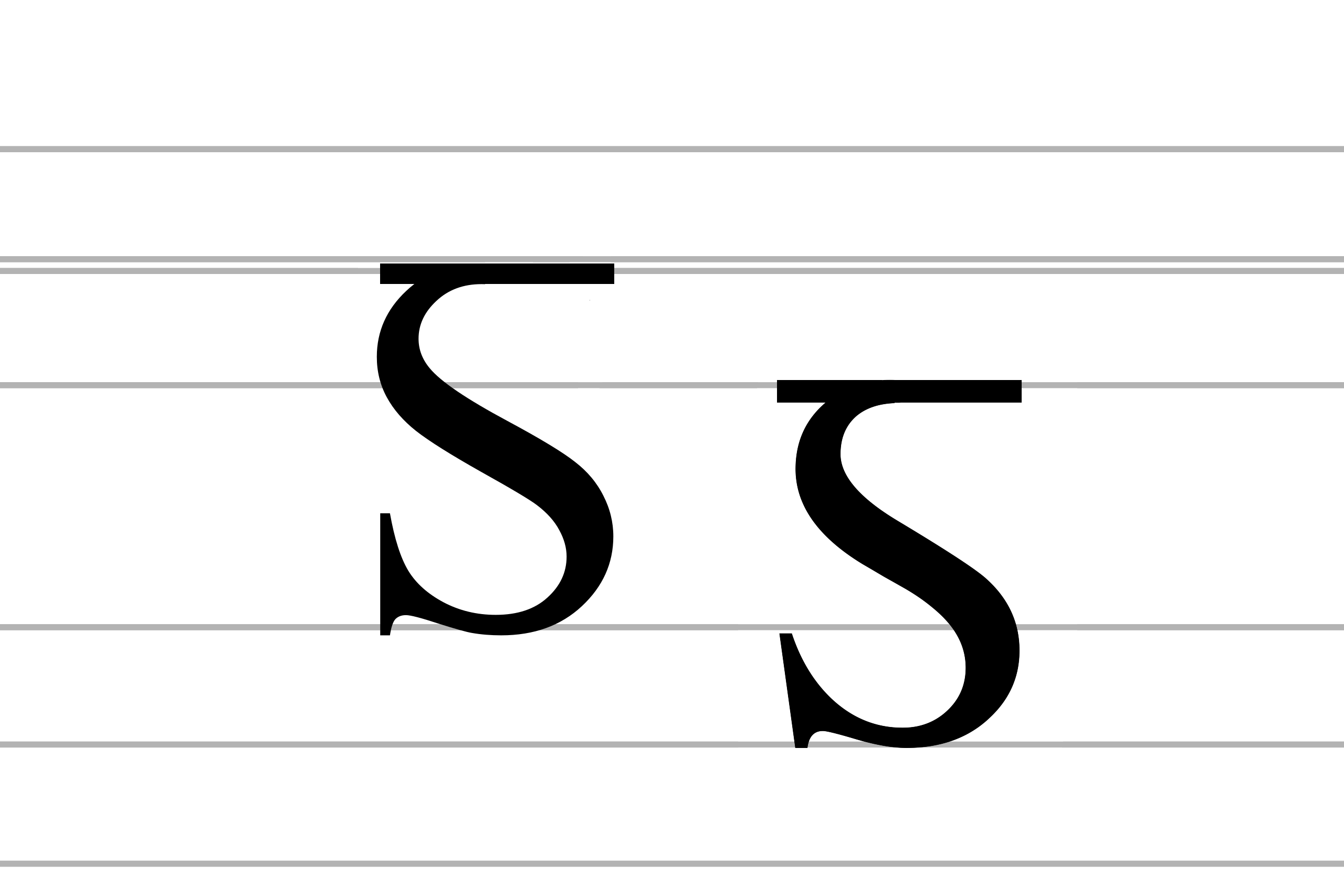

Usage
- Writing system: Latin

History
- Development: G g: Ᵹ ᵹ
- Time period: 600s to 800s

Insular G (majuscule: Ᵹ, minuscule: ᵹ) is a form of the letter g somewhat resembling an ezh, used in the medieval insular script of Great Britain and Ireland. It was first used in the Roman Empire in Roman cursive, then it appeared in Irish half uncial (insular) script, and after it had passed into Old English, it developed into the Middle English letter yogh (Ȝ ȝ). Middle English, having reborrowed the familiar Carolingian g from the Continent, began to use the two forms of g as separate letters.

== Usage ==
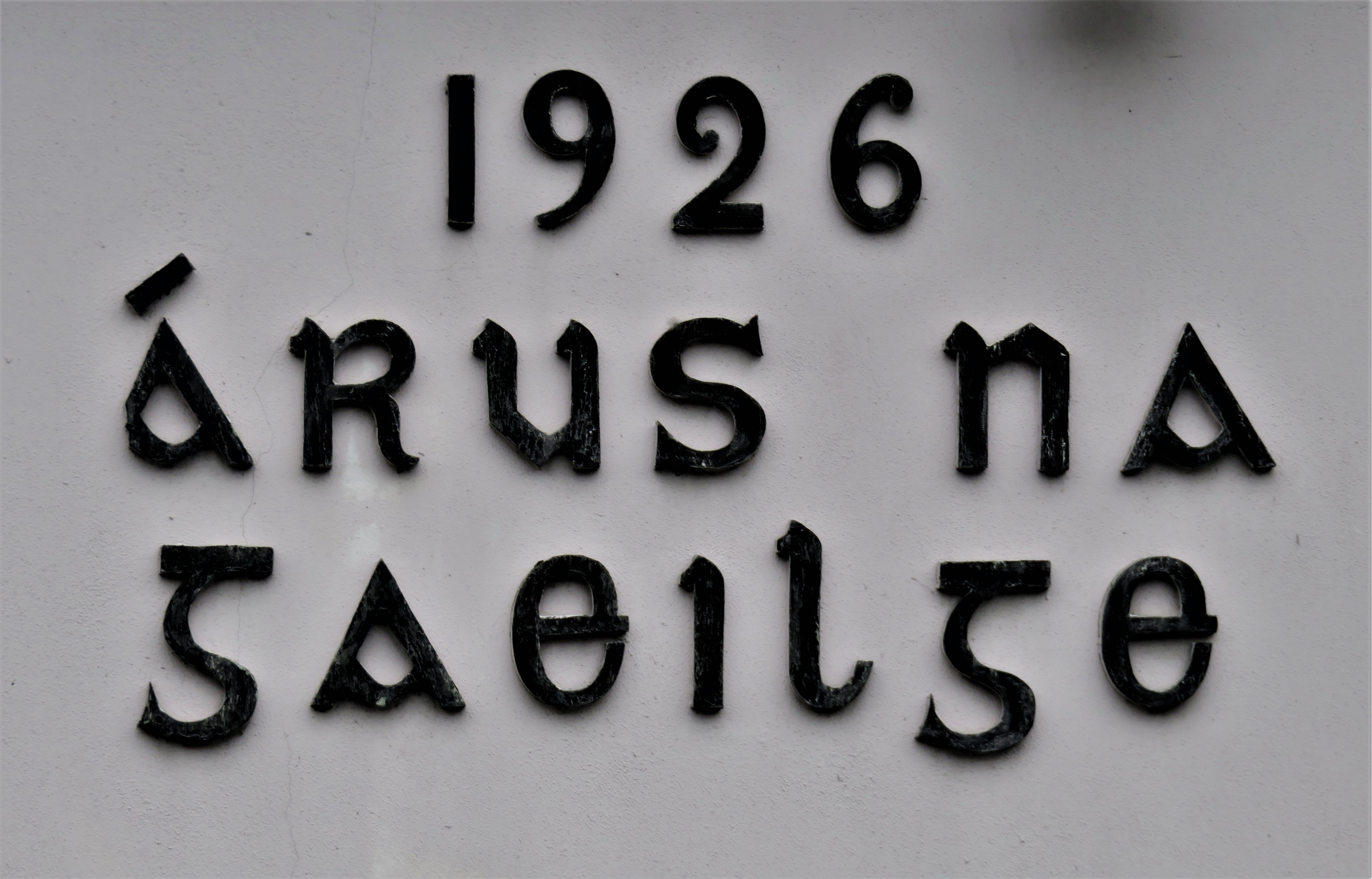
Insular Gs written in Gaelic type in Newcastlewest, Ireland: "1926 – Árus na Gaeilge" (House of Irish)

The lowercase insular g (ᵹ) was used in Irish linguistics as a phonetic character for [ɣ], and on this basis is encoded in the Phonetic Extensions block of Unicode 4.1 (March 2005) as U+1D79. Its capital (Ᵹ) was introduced in Unicode 5.1 (April 2008) at U+A77D. (Note: Gaelic type, used to write Irish and Scottish Gaelic, is a typeface that has glyphs for ⟨G⟩ and ⟨g⟩ that typically resemble the phonetics insular g, but uses U+0047 G LATIN CAPITAL LETTER G and U+0067 g LATIN SMALL LETTER G, not U+1D79 ᵹ LATIN SMALL LETTER INSULAR G and U+A77D Ᵹ LATIN CAPITAL LETTER INSULAR G.)

A turned version of insular g (Ꝿ ꝿ) was used by William Pryce to designate the velar nasal /ŋ/.

== Notes ==
Insular letters in Unicode^{[1]}^{[2]}
	0	1	2	3	4	5	6	7	8	9	A	B	C	D	E	F
U+1ACx													◌ᫌ	◌ᫍ	◌ᫎ	
U+1D7x										ᵹ						
U+1DDx									◌ᷘ							
U+204x											⁊					
U+2E5x			⹒													
U+A77x										Ꝺ	ꝺ	Ꝼ	ꝼ	Ᵹ	Ꝿ	ꝿ
U+A78x			Ꞃ	ꞃ	Ꞅ	ꞅ	Ꞇ	ꞇ								
U+A7Dx	Ꟑ	ꟑ														
Notes 1.As of Unicode version 17.0 2.These characters are spread across the following Unicode blocks: Combining Diacritical Marks Extended (U+1AB0–U+1AFF), Phonetic Extensions (U+1D00–U+1D7F), Combining Diacritical Marks Supplement (U+1DC0–U+1DFF), General Punctuation (U+2000–U+206F), Supplemental Punctuation (U+2E00-U+2E7F), and Latin Extended-D (U+A720–U+A7FF)
