= Insular S =

Insular form of the letter S (Ꞅ)

- Ꞅ ꞅ

Usage
- Writing system: Latin

History
- Development: S s: Ꞅ ꞅ
- Time period: 600s to 800s

The letter Ꞅ (minuscule: ꞅ) is an Insular script form of the letter S. It is encoded in Unicode at U+A784 Ꞅ LATIN CAPITAL LETTER INSULAR S and U+A785 ꞅ LATIN SMALL LETTER INSULAR S.

Evolution of the Insular s from sigma: ς-s-ʃ-ſ-ꞅ

It should not be confused with the long-legged r, U+027C ɼ LATIN SMALL LETTER R WITH LONG LEG, which is an obsolete IPA symbol.

Insular letters in Unicode^{[1]}^{[2]}
	0	1	2	3	4	5	6	7	8	9	A	B	C	D	E	F
U+1ACx													◌ᫌ	◌ᫍ	◌ᫎ	
U+1D7x										ᵹ						
U+1DDx									◌ᷘ							
U+204x											⁊					
U+2E5x			⹒													
U+A77x										Ꝺ	ꝺ	Ꝼ	ꝼ	Ᵹ	Ꝿ	ꝿ
U+A78x			Ꞃ	ꞃ	Ꞅ	ꞅ	Ꞇ	ꞇ								
U+A7Dx	Ꟑ	ꟑ														
Notes 1.As of Unicode version 17.0 2.These characters are spread across the following Unicode blocks: Combining Diacritical Marks Extended (U+1AB0–U+1AFF), Phonetic Extensions (U+1D00–U+1D7F), Combining Diacritical Marks Supplement (U+1DC0–U+1DFF), General Punctuation (U+2000–U+206F), Supplemental Punctuation (U+2E00-U+2E7F), and Latin Extended-D (U+A720–U+A7FF)
