= Gaelic script =

Gaelic script may refer to:

- Insular script used in Ireland
- Gaelic type, based on Insular script
