= Insular script =

Medieval writing system common to Ireland and England

Insular (Gaelic) script
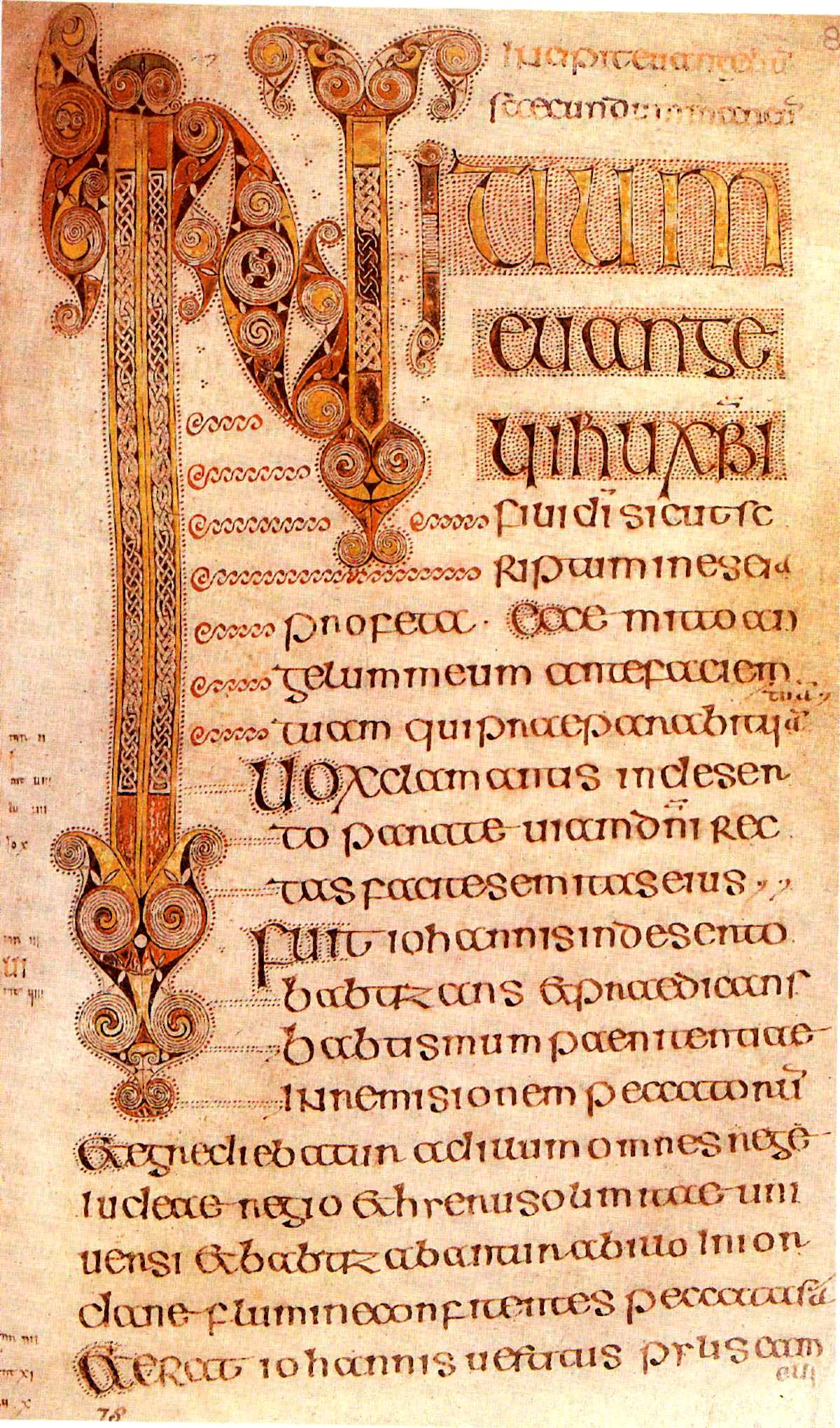
- The beginning of the Gospel of Mark from the Book of Durrow
- Script type: Alphabet
- Period: fl. 600–850 AD
- Languages: Latin, Old Irish, Old English

Related scripts
- Parent systems: Latin script: Insular (Gaelic) script
- Child systems: Gaelic type

Insular script is a medieval script system originating in Ireland that spread to England and continental Europe under the influence of Irish Christianity. Irish missionaries took the script to continental Europe, where they founded monasteries, such as Bobbio. The scripts were also used in monasteries, like Fulda, which were influenced by English missionaries. They are associated with Insular art, of which most surviving examples are illuminated manuscripts. It greatly influenced modern Gaelic type and handwriting.

The term "Insular script" is used to refer to a diverse family of scripts used for different functions. At the top of the hierarchy was the Insular half-uncial (or "Insular majuscule"), used for important documents and sacred text. The full uncial, in a version called "English uncial", was used in some English centres. Then "in descending order of formality and increased speed of writing" came "set minuscule", "cursive minuscule" and "current minuscule". These were used for non-scriptural texts, letters, accounting records, notes, and all the other types of written documents.

== Origin ==
The scripts developed in Ireland in the 7th century and were used as late as the 19th century, though their most flourishing period fell between 600 and 850. They were closely related to the uncial and half-uncial scripts, their immediate influences; the highest grade of Insular script is the majuscule Insular half-uncial, which is closely derived from Continental half-uncial script.

== Appearance ==
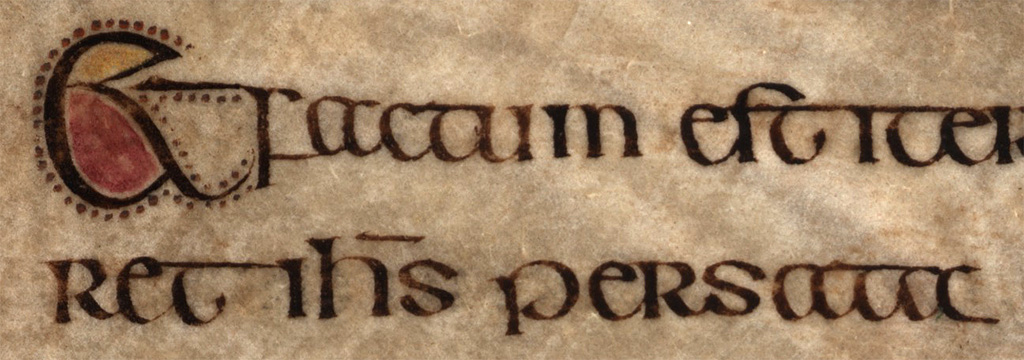
St Chad Gospels: Et factum est iter[um cum sabbatis ambula] / ret ihs [Ihesus] per sata (Mark 2:23, p. 151) "And it came to pass, that Jesus went through the corn fields on the sabbath day".

Simplified relationship between various scripts, showing the development of Insular uncial from Roman and the Greek uncial

Works written in Insular scripts commonly use large initial letters surrounded by red ink dots (although this is also true of other scripts written in Ireland and England). Letters following a large initial at the start of a paragraph or section often gradually diminish in size as they are written across a line or a page, until the normal size is reached, which is called a "diminuendo" effect, and is a distinctive Insular innovation, which later influenced Continental illumination style. Letters with ascenders (b, d, h, l, etc.) are written with triangular or wedge-shaped tops. The bows of letters such as b, d, p, and q are very wide. The script uses many ligatures and has many unique scribal abbreviations, along with many borrowings from Tironian notes.

Insular script was spread to England by the Hiberno-Scottish mission; previously, uncial script had been brought to England by Augustine of Canterbury. The influences of both scripts produced the Insular script system. Within this system, the palaeographer Julian Brown identified five grades, with decreasing formality:

- Insular half-uncial, or "Irish majuscule": the most formal; became reserved for rubrics (highlighted directions) and other displays after the 9th century.
- Insular hybrid minuscule: the most formal of the minuscules, came to be used for formal church books when use of the "Irish majuscule" diminished.
- Insular set minuscule
- Insular cursive minuscule
- Insular current minuscule: the least formal; current here means ‘running’ (rapid).

Brown has also postulated two phases of development for this script, Phase II being mainly influenced by Roman uncial examples, developed at Wearmouth-Jarrow and typified by the Lindisfarne Gospels.

== Usage ==
Insular script was used not only for Latin religious books, but also for every other kind of book, including vernacular works. Examples include the Book of Kells, the Cathach of St. Columba, the Ambrosiana Orosius, the Durham Gospel Fragment, the Book of Durrow, the Durham Gospels, the Echternach Gospels, the Lindisfarne Gospels, the Lichfield Gospels, the St. Gall Gospel Book, and the Book of Armagh.

Insular script was influential in the development of Carolingian minuscule in the scriptoria of the Carolingian empire. At the height of its popularity in the eighth century, its use extended beyond the British Isles into continental Europe as far as Germany and northern Italy.

In Ireland, Insular script was superseded in c. 850 by Late Celtic script; in England, it was followed by a form of Caroline minuscule from the mid tenth century.

=== Abbreviations ===
During the development of Insular script, the tradition of using scribal abbreviations was strong – in the earliest attestations of Insular script around the sixth century, the Insular abbreviation system was already in use. Different traditions of abbreviations appear to have been collapsed into a large, undifferentiated body used by scribes writing in Insular script. English scribes used a much narrower body of abbreviations compared to Celtic scribes.

The Tironian et, ⟨⁊⟩ – equivalent of ampersand ⟨&⟩ – was in widespread use in the script (meaning agus 'and' in Irish, and ond 'and' in Old English) and is occasionally continued in modern Gaelic typefaces derived from Insular script.

== Unicode ==
Unicode treats representation of letters of the Latin alphabet written in insular script as a typeface choice that needs no separate coding. Only a few Insular letters have specific code-points because they are used by phonetic specialists. To render the full alphabet correctly, a suitable display font should be chosen. To display the specialist characters, there are several fonts that may be used; some free ones that support these characters include Junicode and Quivira. Gentium and Charis SIL support ⁊ and the alphabetic letters U+1ACx, U+A77x, U+A78x and U+1D7x.

According to Michael Everson, in the 2006 Unicode proposal for these characters:

To write text in an ordinary Gaelic font, only ASCII letters should be used, the font making all the relevant substitutions; the insular letters [proposed here] are for use only by specialists who require them for particular purposes.

Insular letters in Unicode^{[1]}^{[2]}
	0	1	2	3	4	5	6	7	8	9	A	B	C	D	E	F
U+1ACx													◌ᫌ	◌ᫍ	◌ᫎ	
U+1D7x										ᵹ						
U+1DDx									◌ᷘ							
U+204x											⁊					
U+2E5x			⹒													
U+A77x										Ꝺ	ꝺ	Ꝼ	ꝼ	Ᵹ	Ꝿ	ꝿ
U+A78x			Ꞃ	ꞃ	Ꞅ	ꞅ	Ꞇ	ꞇ								
U+A7Dx	Ꟑ	ꟑ														
Notes 1.As of Unicode version 17.0 2.These characters are spread across the following Unicode blocks: Combining Diacritical Marks Extended (U+1AB0–U+1AFF), Phonetic Extensions (U+1D00–U+1D7F), Combining Diacritical Marks Supplement (U+1DC0–U+1DFF), General Punctuation (U+2000–U+206F), Supplemental Punctuation (U+2E00-U+2E7F), and Latin Extended-D (U+A720–U+A7FF)

== See also ==
- Gaelic type – Typefaces to print Classical Gaelic
- Hiberno-Saxon art – Post-Roman British and Irish style of art
- Insular G – Form of the letter g in Insular script
- Irish orthography – Spelling and punctuation of the Irish language
- Latin delta – Letter of the Latin alphabet
- List of Hiberno-Saxon illustrated manuscripts
- Medieval Unicode Font Initiative – Project coordinating the encoding of medieval texts using the Private Use Area
