= Michael McCormick =

Michael or Mike McCormick may refer to:

- Michael McCormick (actor) (born 1951), American theatre actor
- Michael E. McCormick, American professor, one of the pioneers of modern wave energy research
- Mike McCormick (third baseman) (1882–1953), American baseball player
- Mike McCormick (outfielder) (1917–1976), American baseball player
- Mike McCormick (pitcher) (1938–2020), American baseball player
- Mike McCormick, singer with Canadian band The Arrogant Worms

== See also ==
- Michael McCormack (disambiguation)
