= Gaelic type =

Typefaces to print Classical Gaelic

Gaelic script
- Script type: Alphabet
- Period: Since 1571
- Direction: Left-to-right
- Languages: Modern Irish, Scots Gaelic

Related scripts
- Parent systems: Latin script: Insular script; Gaelic script

ISO 15924
- ISO 15924: Latg (216), Latin (Gaelic variant)

Gaelic type (sometimes called Irish character, Irish type, or Gaelic script) is a family of Insular script typefaces devised for printing Early Modern Irish. It was widely used from the 16th century until the mid-18th century in Scotland and the mid-20th century in Ireland, but is now rarely used. Sometimes, all Gaelic typefaces are called Celtic or uncial although most Gaelic types are not uncials. The "Anglo-Saxon" types of the 17th century are included in this category because both the Anglo-Saxon types and the Gaelic/Irish types derive from the insular manuscript hand.

The terms Gaelic type, Gaelic script and Irish character translate the Modern Irish phrase cló Gaelach (pronounced [ˌkl̪ˠoː ˈɡeːl̪ˠəx]). In Ireland, the term cló Gaelach is used in contrast to the term cló Rómhánach, Roman type.

The Scots Gaelic term is corra-litir (pronounced [ˌkʰɔrˠə ˈliʰtʲɪɾʲ]). Alasdair mac Mhaighstir Alasdair (c. 1698–1770) was one of the last Scottish writers with the ability to write in this script, but his main work, Ais-Eiridh na Sean Chánoin Albannaich, was published in the Roman script.

== Characteristics ==
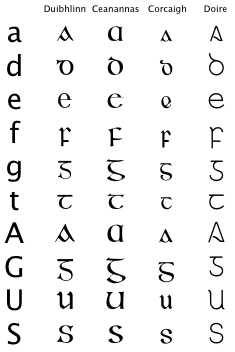
Overview of some Gaelic typefaces

Besides the 26 letters of the Latin alphabet, Gaelic typefaces must include all vowels with acute accents ⟨Áá Éé Íí Óó Úú⟩ as well as a set of consonants with dot above ⟨Ḃḃ Ċċ Ḋḋ Ḟḟ Ġġ Ṁṁ Ṗṗ Ṡṡ Ṫṫ⟩, and the Tironian sign et ⟨⁊⟩, used for agus 'and' in Irish.

Gaelic typefaces also often include insular forms: ⟨ꞃ ꞅ⟩ of the letters ⟨r⟩ and ⟨s⟩, and some of the typefaces contain a number of ligatures used in earlier Gaelic typography and deriving from the manuscript tradition. Lower-case ⟨i⟩ is drawn without a dot (though it is not the Turkish dotless ⟨ı⟩), and the letters ⟨d f g t⟩ have insular shapes ⟨ꝺ ꝼ ᵹ ꞇ⟩.

Many modern Gaelic typefaces include Gaelic letterforms for the letters ⟨j k q v w x y z⟩, and typically provide support for at least the vowels of the other Celtic languages. They also distinguish between ⟨&⟩ and ⟨⁊⟩ (as did traditional typography), though some modern fonts replace the ampersand with the Tironian note ostensibly because both mean 'and'.

== History ==
The word Corcaigh in the Gaelic-script font of the same name.

The Irish uncial alphabet originated in medieval manuscripts as an "insular" variant of the Latin alphabet. The first Gaelic typeface was designed in 1571 for Aibidil Gaoidheilge agus Caiticiosma, a catechism commissioned by Elizabeth I to help attempt to convert the Irish Catholic population to Anglicanism.

In 1611, Franciscans from Leuven/Louvain (Belgium) created their own typeface, known as Louvain Irish Type.

== Use ==
Typesetting in Gaelic script remained common in Ireland until the mid-20th century. Gaelic script is today used merely for decorative typesetting; for example, a number of traditional Irish newspapers still print their name in Gaelic script on the first page, and it is also popular for pub signs, greeting cards, and display advertising. Edward Lhuyd's grammar of the Cornish language used Gaelic-script consonants to indicate sounds like [ð] and [θ].

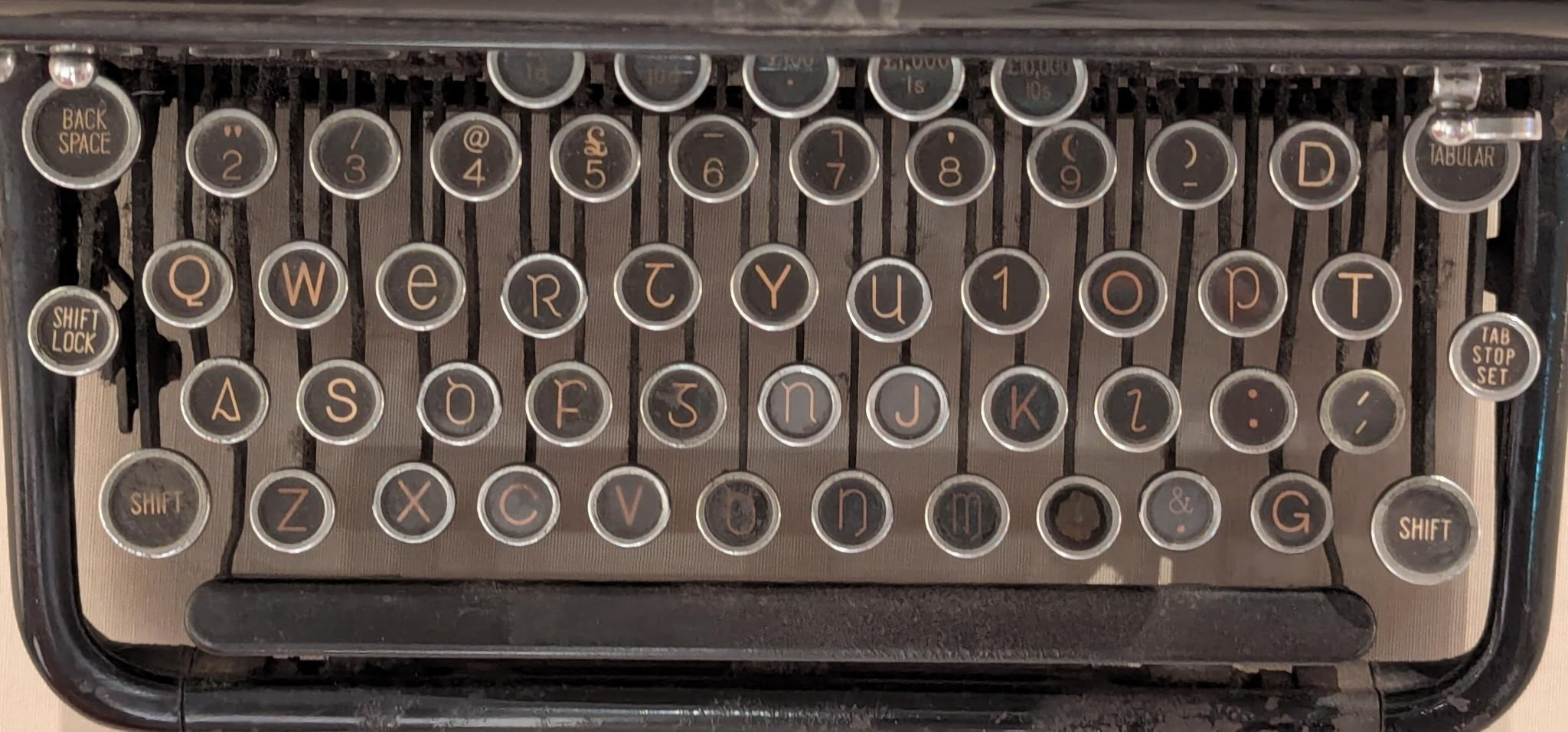
The Royal 'Cló Gaelach' typewriter in Galway City Museum

In 1996 RTÉ created a new corporate logo. The logo consists of a modern take on the Gaelic type face. The R's counter is large with a short tail, the T is roman script while the E is curved but does not have a counter like a lower case E, and the letters also have slight serifs to them. TG4's original logo, under the brand TnaG, also used a modernization of the font, the use of the curved T and a sans-serif A in the word na. Other Irish companies that have used Gaelic script in their logos including the GAA, Telecom Éireann and An Post. The Garda Síochána uses Gaelic Script on its official seal.

== In Unicode ==
Unicode treats the Gaelic script as a font variant of the Latin alphabet with precomposed characters for the letters with diacritics (the glyphs shown here are representative glyphs from a Roman typeface and will not have the correct appearance unless a Gaelic typeface is used):

Letters with diacritics used in Gaelic type
U+00C1 Á LATIN CAPITAL LETTER A WITH ACUTE	U+00E1 á LATIN SMALL LETTER A WITH ACUTE
U+1E02 Ḃ LATIN CAPITAL LETTER B WITH DOT ABOVE	U+1E03 ḃ LATIN SMALL LETTER B WITH DOT ABOVE
U+010A Ċ LATIN CAPITAL LETTER C WITH DOT ABOVE	U+010B ċ LATIN SMALL LETTER C WITH DOT ABOVE
U+1E0A Ḋ LATIN CAPITAL LETTER D WITH DOT ABOVE	U+1E0B ḋ LATIN SMALL LETTER D WITH DOT ABOVE
U+00C9 É LATIN CAPITAL LETTER E WITH ACUTE	U+00E9 é LATIN SMALL LETTER E WITH ACUTE
U+1E1E Ḟ LATIN CAPITAL LETTER F WITH DOT ABOVE	U+1E1F ḟ LATIN SMALL LETTER F WITH DOT ABOVE
U+0120 Ġ LATIN CAPITAL LETTER G WITH DOT ABOVE	U+0121 ġ LATIN SMALL LETTER G WITH DOT ABOVE
U+00CD Í LATIN CAPITAL LETTER I WITH ACUTE	U+00ED í LATIN SMALL LETTER I WITH ACUTE
U+1E40 Ṁ LATIN CAPITAL LETTER M WITH DOT ABOVE	U+1E41 ṁ LATIN SMALL LETTER M WITH DOT ABOVE
U+00D3 Ó LATIN CAPITAL LETTER O WITH ACUTE	U+00F3 ó LATIN SMALL LETTER O WITH ACUTE
U+1E56 Ṗ LATIN CAPITAL LETTER P WITH DOT ABOVE	U+1E57 ṗ LATIN SMALL LETTER P WITH DOT ABOVE
U+1E60 Ṡ LATIN CAPITAL LETTER S WITH DOT ABOVE	U+1E61 ṡ LATIN SMALL LETTER S WITH DOT ABOVE
U+1E6A Ṫ LATIN CAPITAL LETTER T WITH DOT ABOVE	U+1E6B ṫ LATIN SMALL LETTER T WITH DOT ABOVE
U+00DA Ú LATIN CAPITAL LETTER U WITH ACUTE	U+00FA ú LATIN SMALL LETTER U WITH ACUTE

=== Similar linguistics graphemes ===
The glyphs in Gaelic types typically resemble their related phonetics characters. For example, the letterforms used for ⟨G⟩ and ⟨g⟩ resemble the linguistics insular g, but (in normal text) it is correct to use U+0047 G LATIN CAPITAL LETTER G and U+0067 g LATIN SMALL LETTER G with a Gaelic type (font) specified (and incorrect to use U+1D79 ᵹ LATIN SMALL LETTER INSULAR G and U+A77D Ᵹ LATIN CAPITAL LETTER INSULAR G unless writing about linguistics).

According to Michael Everson, in the 2006 Unicode proposal for these characters:

To write text in an ordinary Gaelic font, only ASCII letters should be used, the font making all the relevant substitutions

— the insular letters [proposed herewith] are for use only by specialists who require them for particular purposes.

Unicode 5.1 (2008) added a capital G (Ᵹ) and both capital and lowercase letters D, F, R, S, T, besides "turned insular G", on the basis that Edward Lhuyd used these letters in his 1707 work Archæologia Britannica as a scientific orthography for Cornish.

- Ꝺ ꝺ Insular D (U+A779, U+A77A)
- ◌ᷘ Combining Small Insular D (U+1DD8) (Used for Old Norse)
- Ꝼ ꝼ Insular F (U+A77B, U+A77C)
- Ᵹ ᵹ Insular G (U+A77D, U+1D79)
- Ꝿ ꝿ Turned insular G (U+A77E, U+A77F)
- Ꞃ ꞃ Insular R (U+A782, U+A783)
- Ꞅ ꞅ Insular S (U+A784, U+A785)
- Ꞇ ꞇ Insular T (U+A786, U+A787)

Unicode 14.0 (2021) added characters, including Insular letters, for the Ormulum:

- Ꟑ ꟑ Closed Insular G (U+A7D0, U+A7D1)
- ◌ᫌ Combining Insular G (U+1ACC)
- ◌ᫍ Combining Insular R (U+1ACD)
- ◌ᫎ Combining Insular T (U+1ACE)

== Samples ==
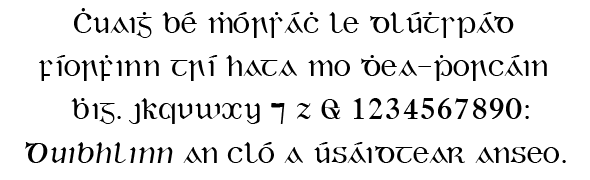
Duibhlinn (digital type 1993, based on Monotype Series 24 A, 1906)

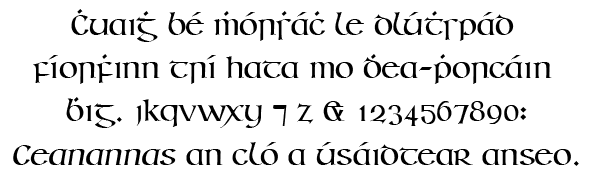
Ceanannas (digital type 1993, based on drawings of Book of Kells lettering by Arthur Baker.)

In each figure above, the first sentence is a pangram and reads:
Chuaigh bé mhórshách le dlúthspád fíorfhinn trí hata mo dhea-phorcáin bhig,
Ċuaiġ bé ṁórṡáċ le dlúṫspád fíorḟinn trí hata mo ḋea-ṗorcáin ḃig,
meaning "A maiden of great appetite with an intensely white, dense spade went through my good little porker’s hat".
The second sentence (bottom line) reads:
Duibhlinn/Ceanannas an cló a úsáidtear anseo,
meaning "Duibhlinn/Ceannanas is the typeface used here".
The second sentence uses the short forms of the letters r and s; the first uses the long forms. See: Long s and R rotunda.

== Gallery ==
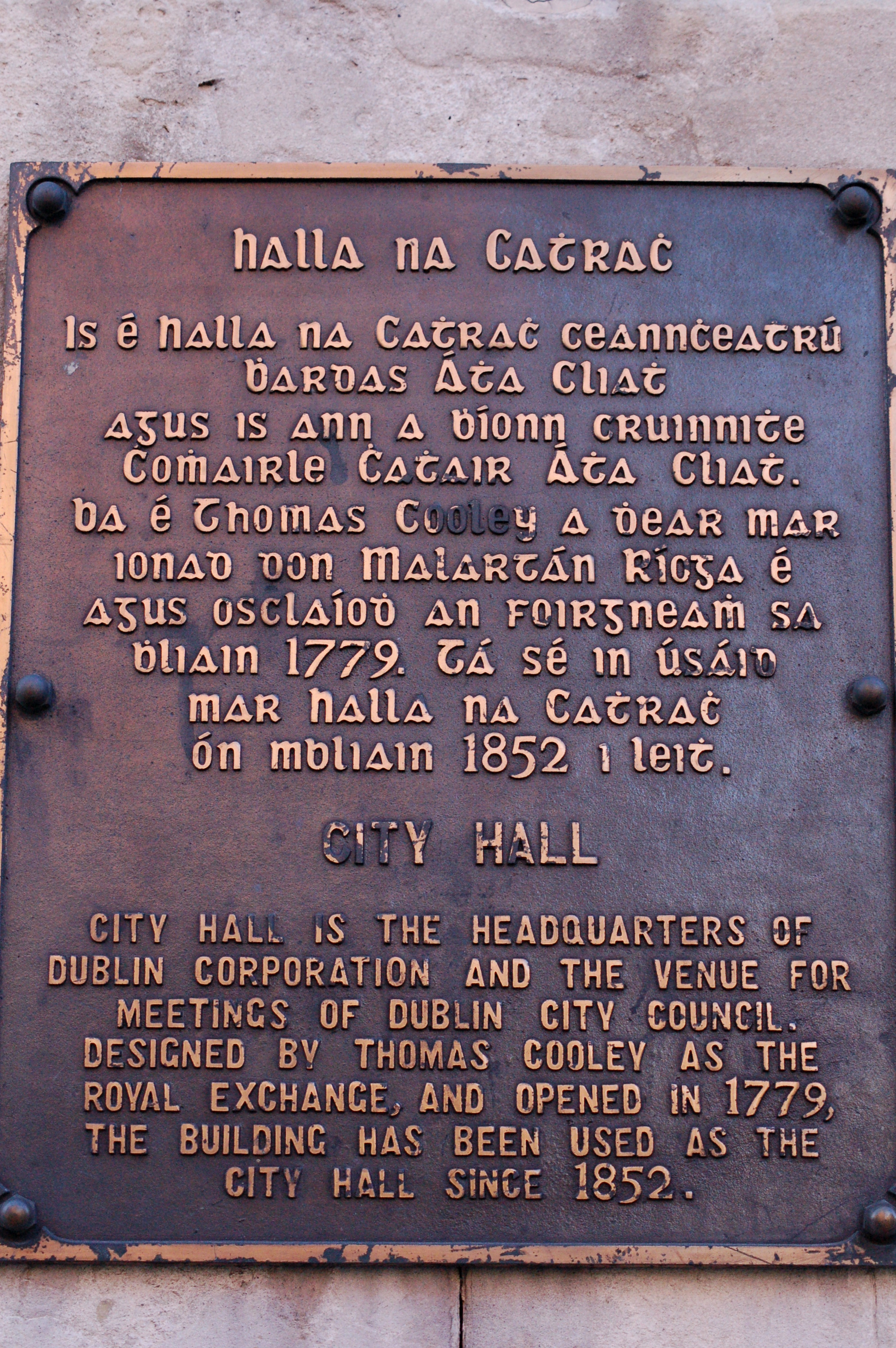
Gaelic script used on an information plaque outside City Hall, near Dublin Castle.

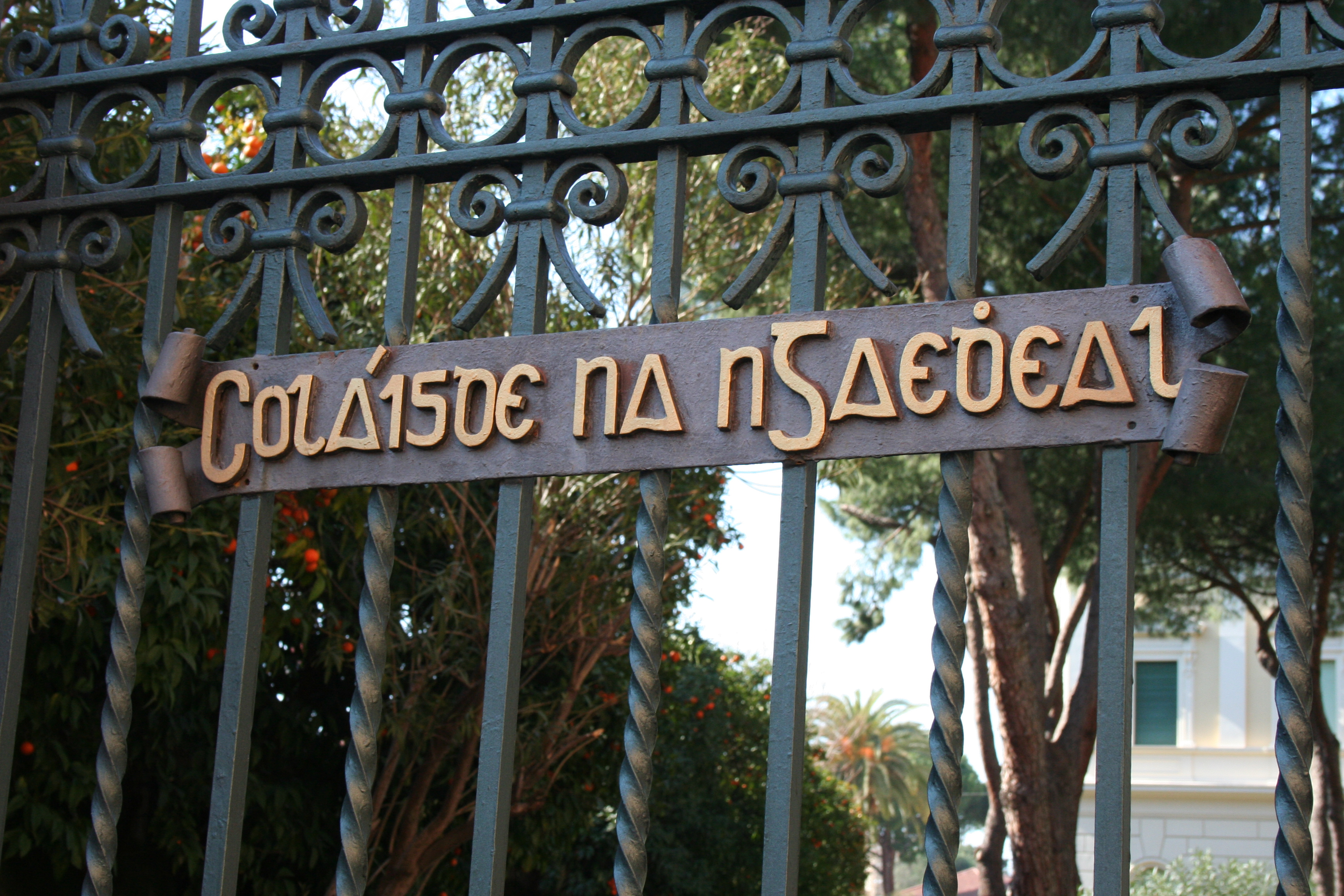
Gaelic script on the gates of the Pontifical Irish College in Rome.

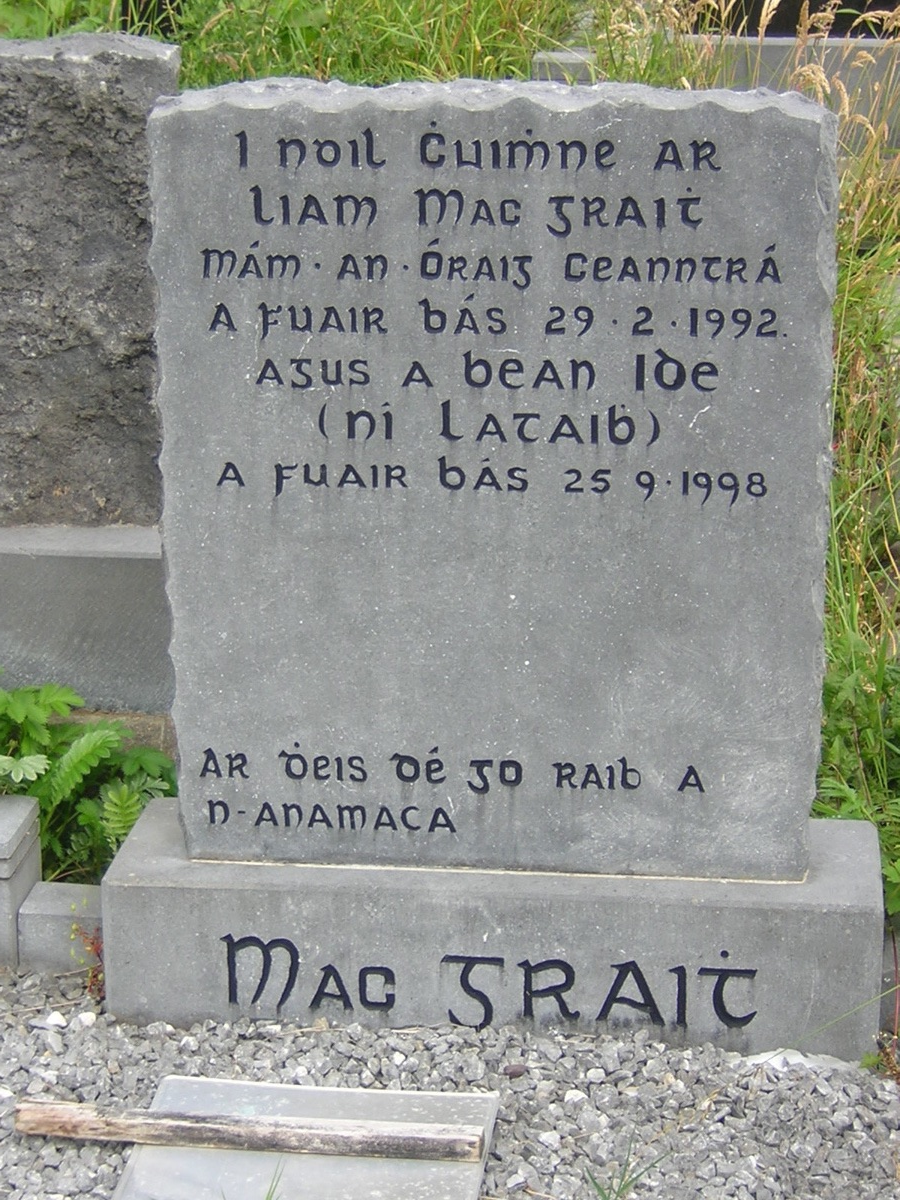
Gaelic script on a gravestone in County Kerry.

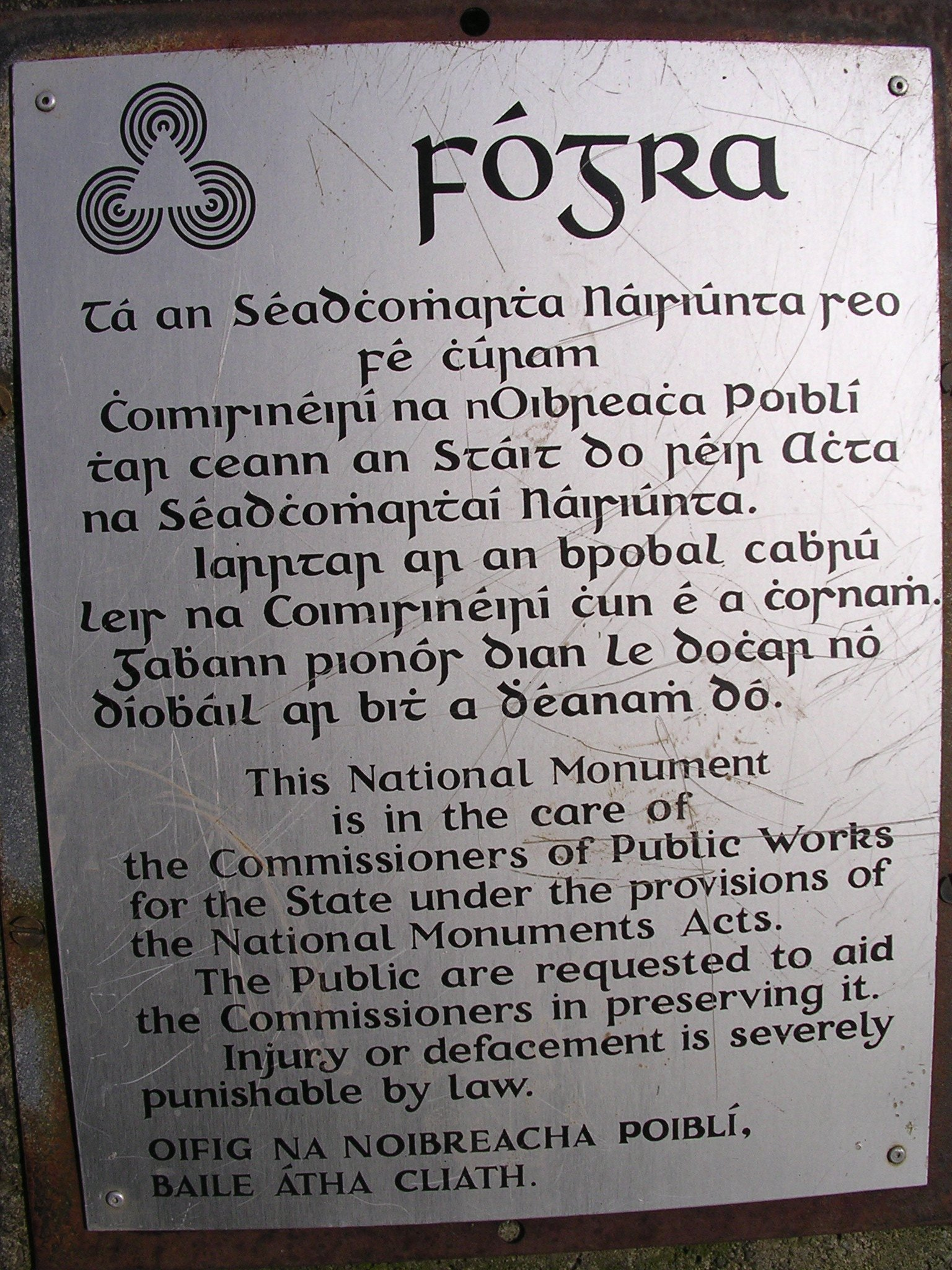
Gaelic script on an Irish national monument.

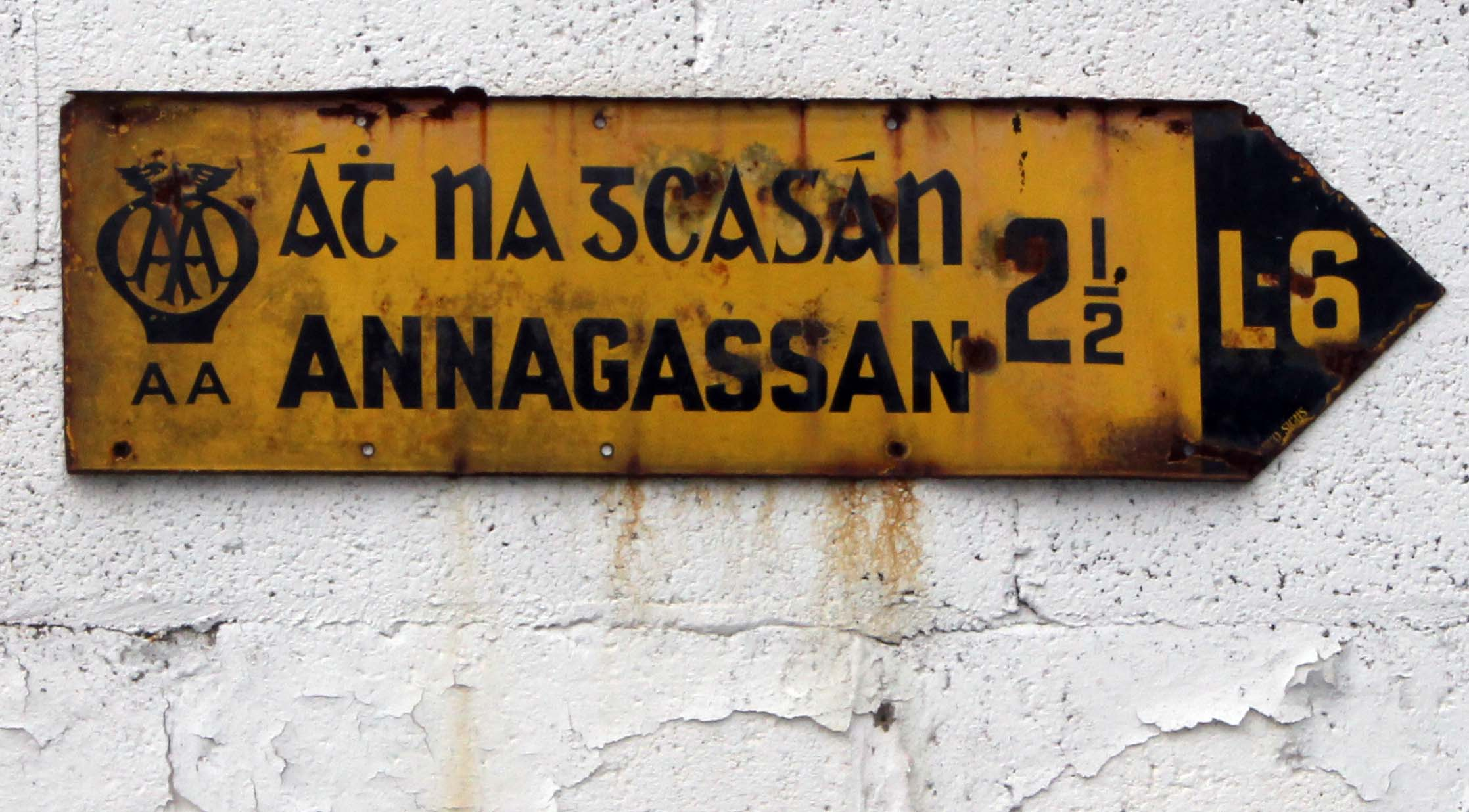
Old road sign, reading Áth na gCasán

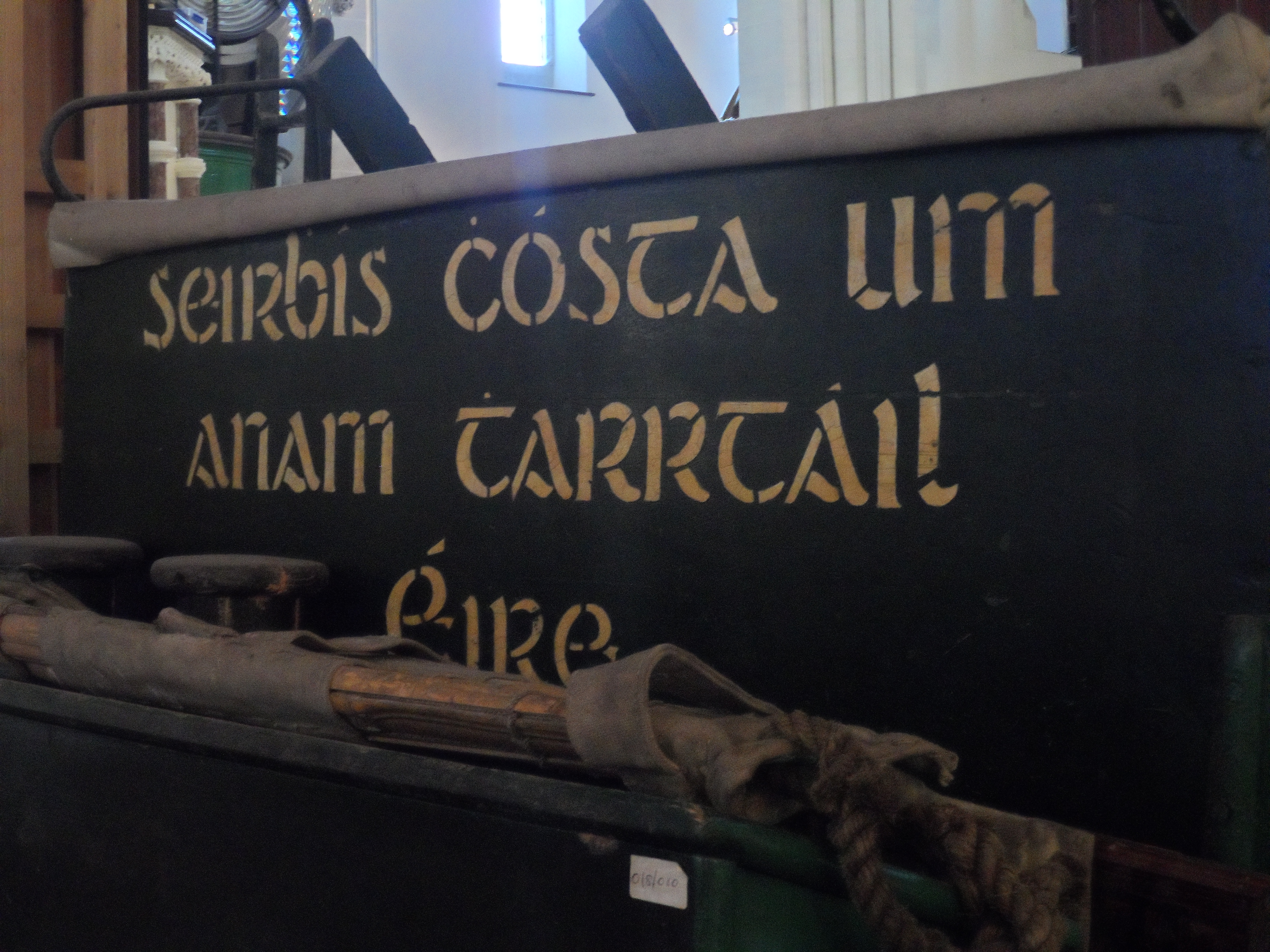
Stencilled Gaelic type

Poem

== See also ==
- Blackletter – Historic European script and typeface
- Fraktur – Blackletter typeface
- Irish orthography – Spelling and punctuation of the Irish language
- ISO/IEC 8859-14 – 8-bit character set
- Theobald Stapleton – Irish Roman Catholic priest and martyr (who devised an Antiqua orthography for Irish in 1639)

== Sources ==
- Lynam, E. W. 1969. The Irish character in print: 1571–1923. New York: Barnes & Noble. First printed as Oxford University Press offprint 1924 in Transactions of the Bibliographical Society, 4th Series, Vol. IV, No. 4, March 1924.)
- McGuinne, Dermot. Irish type design: A history of printing types in the Irish character. Blackrock: Irish Academic Press. ISBN 0-7165-2463-5
