= Jan van Vliet =

Jan van Vliet (April 11, 1622 – March 18, 1666), also known as Janus Ulitius, was one of the 17th-century pioneers of Germanic philology.

== Biography ==
Van Vliet was probably born in Middelburg, but grew up in The Hague. From 1637 to about 1641 he studied at Leiden University, where he read first classics and then law. After completing his studies, he went on a grand tour, travelling in Britain and France, where he collected material for his first publication, the Venatio novantiqua (1645), an edition of Latin poetry on the subject of hunting. He also kept a diary of his travels, which testifies to his having been fluent in six languages at the time.

On his return to the Netherlands in 1643, Van Vliet began to practice as a lawyer, and the following year he married. His legal career was not a great success, and after some years he left the capital and took up residence in Breda. Here he achieved some measure of prosperity, ultimately becoming the town registrar under the patronage of the house of Orange.

In the 1650s, his two great interests, ancient languages and the history of the Netherlands, led him to begin to study the histories of first the Dutch language, and then the Germanic languages in general. This was not a popular field of study at the time, the historical languages deemed most worthy of academic attention being Greek, Latin, and Hebrew. This shift in interests led to some tension between Van Vliet and several of his old friends, who were not best pleased to see a man they esteemed as a Latinist turn to study lesser things; a letter survives from Nicholas Heinsius, who had been a fellow student at Leiden, addressed "to Vlitius, the authority on antiquities both barbarian and scholarly", a veiled criticism which appears not to have gone unnoticed. Despite this tacit disapproval, however, Van Vliet began to study ancient books and manuscripts in various Germanic languages, including English.

It was in 1659 that he began to correspond regularly with his more famous contemporary Franciscus Junius, who was then resident in England, but visiting the Netherlands frequently. Their common interest in the study and collection of manuscripts led them to become firm friends, and Van Vliet appears to have made considerable use of Junius' library in his studies in his final years.

Van Vliet died in Breda in March 1666. He had run up considerable debts towards the end of his life, and as a result many of his possessions were auctioned at The Hague to pay these off; these included his library, which according to the auction catalogue contained some 1,249 books, including eight manuscripts. At least one of these was purchased by Junius: this was the unique manuscript of the Ormulum. It is as the first known owner of this manuscript in modern times that Van Vliet is primarily remembered today.

== Notes ==
1. "Vlitio antiquitatis utriusque, tam barbaræ quam eruditæ, peritissimo". Quoted by Holt (1878:lv).
