= Carolingian G =

Form of the letter G

(Carolingian) G

Insular G

The Carolingian G or French G is the evolved classical form of the letter G that was in use in most Middle English alphabets. The other form scholars and writers familiar with Celtic Britain generally knew and could use, and in the furthest places in Britain away from England exclusively used domestically, was the insular (or Irish) G, which could bear a well-understood extra phonetic sense, when writing of the local people, places and language. Unlike the vowel u and consonants which could appear ambiguous such as s, it had no special rules as to choice of letter in Middle English orthography.

The form is named for the Carolingian minuscule script, an exemplar of its use and which features in papal manuscripts.

== Context ==
Its forms, varying little, are the basis of and frequently match the modern letter G. Insular G evolved very largely into digraphs gh, ch, but in its early days some writers used it for yogh. Yogh dissolved in Scottish proper names to z due to its lower case equivalent written look but in loanwords often to y or i to reserve z for the rising number of Greek loanwords featuring z such as zodiac and to distinguish words such as zeal (from seal). By the 18th century, the script had 26 base characters for letters (with upper case counterparts) promulgated by most major printing presses and taught in alphabet nursery rhymes. This was a re-evolution to go beyond late medieval Ecclesiastical Latin's clipped content of 22–23 letters. Despite this widening across most, then almost all, formal teaching in Europe, g has a quite diverse phonetic value across languages following its development from c, which shares this trait.

Excerpt of history of the Latin script showing the competing variants of commonly-taught scripts

It is the standard letter form for G in all modern Latin-script alphabets.
