= Michael McCormack =

Michael or Mike McCormack may refer to:

- Michael McCormack (Australian politician) (born 1964), Australian politician and former Deputy Prime Minister (2018-2021)
- Michael McCormack (judge) (born 1939), justice of the Nebraska Supreme Court
- Michael McCormack (Gaelic footballer) (1943−2002), played as a full-back for Tipperary
- Michael J. McCormack (born c.1946), Boston politician and lawyer
- Mike McCormack (American football) (1930−2013), played with the Cleveland Browns and coached the Eagles, Colts, and Seahawks
- Mike McCormack (police officer), Toronto Police officer and Toronto Police Association president
- Mike McCormack (politician) (1921−2020), US Congressman from Washington
- Mike McCormack (writer) (born 1965), Irish novelist and short story writer

== See also ==
- Michael McCormick (disambiguation)
