= Aibidil Gaoidheilge agus Caiticiosma =

1571 printed book in Irish language

- Author: John Kearney Irish: Seán Ó Cearnaigh
- Language: Irish
- Genre: Catechism
- Published: 1571 by John Ussher (Seón Uiser)
- Publication place: Ireland
- Media type: Print (hardcover)

Aibidil Gaoidheilge agus Caiticiosma ('Irish Alphabet and Catechism') is the first printed book in the Irish language, and also the first in Gaelic type. Meant as a Protestant primer, the book was written by John O'Kearney or Kearney (Irish: Seán Ó Cearnaigh), a treasurer of St. Patrick's Cathedral, Dublin. It includes a short section on the spelling and sounds of Irish. The lengthy full title translates to Alphabet of the Irish language and Catechism, that is Christian instruction or teaching along with certain articles of the Christian rule that are proper for everyone who would be obedient to the law of God and the Queen in this kingdom. Translated from Latin and English into Irish by John O'Kearney.

The production of this book was part of a larger endeavour by Irish Protestants to print the Bible in the Irish language so that the common person could read it. The book was printed on a press which was set up in the home of Alderman John Ussher (Early Modern Irish: Seón Uiser). Ussher, who was a well-known Dublin Protestant, also paid for the venture.

The last paragraph on the cover page states the location and date of the printing: "Do buaileadh so ágcló ghaoidheilge, a mBaile Atha clíath, ar chosdas mhaighisdir Sheón Uiser aldarman, ós chion an dhroichid, an 20 lá do Juín 1571", which translates to 'Printed in Gaelic type in Dublin at the expense of master John Ussher, alderman, [at his house] over the bridge, 20th day of June 1571'. Though the printer's identity is unknown, it is possible that William Kearney, a nephew of John Kearney was the printer.

Although 200 copies of the book were originally printed, only four known copies survive. In 1995, a copy of the book was bought by Trinity College Library Dublin for £47,700 ($76,463) at Christie's.

== See also ==
- Gaelic type
- Bible translations into Irish
