= Ormulum =

12th century English book of homilies

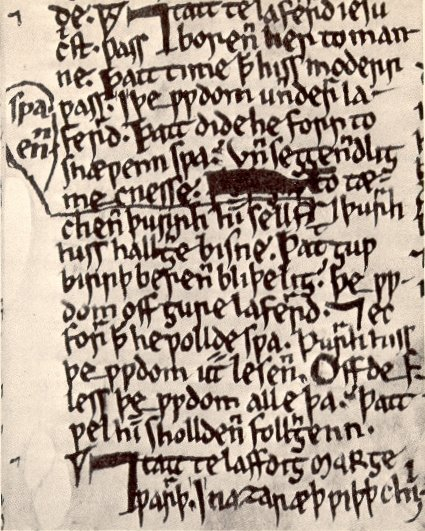
A page from the Ormulum demonstrating the editing performed over time by Orrm, as well as the insertions of new readings by "Hand B"

The Ormulum or Orrmulum is a twelfth-century work of biblical exegesis, written by an Augustinian canon named Orrm (or Orrmin) and consisting of just under 19,000 lines of early Middle English verse. Because of the unique phonemic orthography adopted by its author, the work preserves many details of English pronunciation existing at a time when the language was in flux after the Norman Conquest of England in 1066. Consequently, it is invaluable to philologists and historical linguists in tracing the development of the language.

After a preface and dedication, the work consists of homilies explicating the biblical texts set for the mass throughout the liturgical year. It was intended to be consulted as the texts changed, and is agreed to be tedious and repetitive when read straight through. Only about a fifth of the promised material is in the single manuscript of the work to survive, which is in the Bodleian Library in Oxford.

Orrm developed an idiosyncratic spelling system. Modern scholars have noted that the system reflected his concern with priests' ability to speak the vernacular and may have helped to guide his readers in the pronunciation of the vowels. Many local priests may have been regular speakers of Anglo-Norman French rather than English. Orrm used a strict poetic metre to ensure that readers know which syllables are to be stressed. Modern scholars use these two features to reconstruct Middle English as Orrm spoke it.

== Origins ==
Unusually for work of the period, the Ormulum is neither anonymous nor untitled. Orrm names himself at the end of the dedication:

Early Middle English	Modern English
Icc was þær þær i crisstnedd was	Where I was christened, I was
Orrmin bi name nemmnedd	named Orrmin by name (Ded. 323–24)

At the start of the preface, the author identifies himself again, using a different spelling of his name, and gives the work a title:

Early Middle English	Modern English
Þiss boc iss nemmnedd Orrmulum	This book is named Orrmulum,
forrþi þatt Orrm itt wrohhte	for Orrm wrought [created] it (Pref. 1–2) (Note: Quotations are from Holt (1878). The dedication and preface are both numbered separately from the main body of the poem.)

The name Orrm derives from Old Norse, meaning worm, serpent or dragon. With the suffix of "myn" for "man" (hence "Orrmin"), it was a common name throughout the Danelaw area of England. The metre probably dictated the choice between each of the two forms of the name. The title of the poem, Ormulum, is modeled after the Latin word speculum ("mirror"), so popular in the title of medieval Latin non-fiction works that the term speculum literature is used for the genre.

The Danish name is not unexpected; the language of the Ormulum, an East Midlands dialect, is stringently of the Danelaw. It includes numerous Old Norse phrases (particularly doublets, where an English and Old Norse term are co-joined), but there are very few Old French influences on Orrm's language. Another—likely previous—East Midlands work, the Peterborough Chronicle, shows a great deal of French influence. The linguistic contrast between it and the work of Orrm demonstrates both the sluggishness of the Norman influence in the formerly Danish areas of England and the assimilation of Old Norse features into early Middle English.

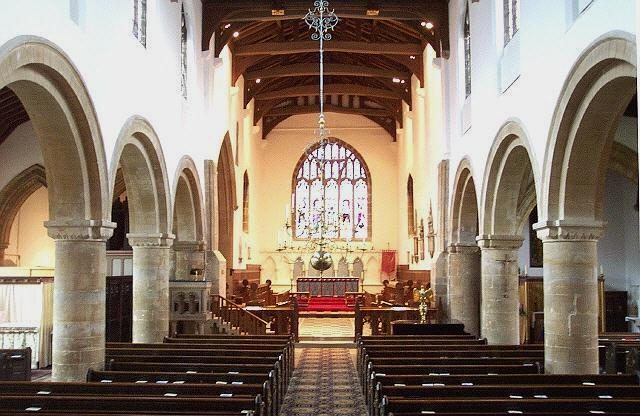
The interior of the church of Bourne Abbey in Lincolnshire, where the Ormulum may have been composed: the two nave arcades with Romanesque (Norman) arches, although now whitewashed, remain from the church Orrm would have known.

According to the work's dedication, Orrm wrote it at the behest of Brother Walter, who was his brother both affterr þe flæshess kinde (biologically, "after the flesh's kind") and as a fellow canon of an Augustinian order. With this information, and the evidence of the dialect of the text, it is possible to propose a place of origin with reasonable certainty. While some scholars, among them Henry Bradley, have regarded the likely origin as Elsham Priory in north Lincolnshire, as of the mid-1990s it became widely accepted that Orrm wrote in the Bourne Abbey in Bourne, Lincolnshire. Two additional pieces of evidence support this conjecture: firstly, Arrouaisian canons established the abbey in 1138, and secondly, the work includes dedicatory prayers to Peter and Paul, the patrons of Bourne Abbey. The Arrouaisian rule was largely that of Augustine, so that its houses often are loosely referred to as Augustinian.

Scholars cannot pinpoint the exact date of composition. Orrm wrote his book over a period of decades and the manuscript shows signs of multiple corrections through time. Since it is an autograph, with two of the three hands in the text generally believed by scholars to be Orrm's own, the date of the manuscript and the date of composition would have been the same. On the evidence of the third hand (that of a collaborator who entered the pericopes at the head of each homily) it is thought that the manuscript was finished c. 1180, but Orrm may have begun the work as early as 1150. The text has few topical references to specific events that could be used to identify the period of composition more precisely.

== Manuscript ==
Only one copy of the Ormulum exists, as Bodleian Library MS Junius 1. in Oxford. In its current state, the manuscript is incomplete: the book's table of contents claims that there were 242 homilies, but only 32 remain. It seems likely that the work was never finished on the scale planned when the table of contents was written, but much of the discrepancy was probably caused by the loss of gatherings from the manuscript. There is no doubt that such losses have occurred even in modern times, as the Dutch antiquarian Jan van Vliet, one of its seventeenth-century owners, copied out passages that are not in the present text. The amount of redaction in the text, plus the loss of possible gatherings, led J. A. W. Bennett to comment that "only about one fifth survives, and that in the ugliest of manuscripts".

The parchment used in the manuscript is of the lowest quality, and the text is written untidily, with an eye to economical use of space; it is laid out in continuous lines like prose, with words and lines close together, and with various additions and corrections, new exegesis, and allegorical readings, crammed into the corners of the margins (as can be seen in the reproduction above). Robert Burchfield argues that these indications "suggest that it was a 'workshop' draft which the author intended to have recopied by a professional scribe".

It seems curious that a text so obviously written with the expectation that it would be widely copied should exist in only one manuscript and that, apparently, a draft. Treharne has taken this as suggesting that it is not only modern readers who have found the work tedious. Orrm, however, says in the preface that he wishes Walter to remove any wording that he finds clumsy or incorrect.

The provenance of the manuscript before the seventeenth century is unclear. From a signature on the flyleaf we know that it was in van Vliet's collection in 1659. It was auctioned in 1666, after his death, and probably was purchased by Franciscus Junius, from whose library it came to the Bodleian as part of the Junius donation.^{[a]}

== Contents and style ==
The Ormulum consists of 18,956 lines of metrical verse, explaining Christian teaching on each of the texts used in the mass throughout the church calendar. As such, it is the first new homily cycle in English since the works of Ælfric of Eynsham (c. 990). The motivation was to provide an accessible English text for the benefit of the less educated, which might include some clergy who found it difficult to understand the Latin of the Vulgate, and the parishioners who in most cases would not understand spoken Latin at all.

Each homily begins with a paraphrase of a Gospel reading (important when the laity did not understand Latin), followed by exegesis. The theological content is derivative; Orrm closely follows Bede's exegesis of Luke, the Enarrationes in Matthoei, and the Glossa Ordinaria of the Bible. Thus, he reads each verse primarily allegorically rather than literally. Rather than identify individual sources, Orrm refers frequently to "ðe boc" and to the "holy book". Bennett has speculated that the Acts of the Apostles, Glossa Ordinaria, and Bede were bound together in a large Vulgate Bible in the abbey so that Orrm truly was getting all of his material from a source that was, to him, a single book.

Although the sermons have been deemed "of little literary or theological value" and though Orrm has been said to possess "only one rhetorical device", that of repetition, the Ormulum never was intended as a book in the modern sense, but rather as a companion to the liturgy. Priests would read, and congregations hear, only a day's entry at a time. The tedium that many experience when attempting to read the Ormulum today would not exist for persons hearing only a single homily each day. Furthermore, although Orrm's poetry is, perhaps, subliterary, the homilies were meant for easy recitation or chanting, not for aesthetic appreciation; everything from the overly strict metre to the orthography might function only to aid oratory.

Although earlier metrical homilies, such as those of Ælfric and Wulfstan, were based on the rules of Old English poetry, they took sufficient liberties with metre to be readable as prose. Orrm does not follow their example. Rather, he adopts a "jog-trot fifteener" for his rhythm, based on the Latin iambic septenarius, and writes continuously, neither dividing his work into stanzas nor rhyming his lines, again following Latin poetry. Orrm was humble about his oeuvre: he admits in the preface that he frequently has padded the lines to fill out the metre, "to help those who read it", and urges his brother Walter to edit the poetry to make it more meet.

A brief sample may help to illustrate the style of the work. This passage explains the background to the Nativity:

Early Middle English	Modern English	Literal etymological translation
Forrþrihht anan se time comm	As soon as the time came	Forthright anon the time came
þatt ure Drihhtin wollde	that our Lord wanted	That our Drighten would
ben borenn i þiss middellærd	to be born in this middle-earth	be born in this middle-earth
forr all mannkinne nede	for the sake of all mankind,	for all mankind's need
he chæs himm sone kinnessmenn	at once he chose kinsmen for himself,	he chose him soon kinsmen,
all swillke summ he wollde	all just as he wanted,	all such as he would,
⁊ whær he wollde borenn ben	and he decided that he would be born	and where he would born be
he chæs all att hiss wille.	exactly where he wished.	He chose all at his will. (line 3494, 501)^{[a]}

== Orthography ==
Rather than literary or theological merit, the chief scholarly value of the Ormulum derives from Orrm's idiosyncratic orthographical system. Orrm employs novel spelling and diacritic conventions that consistently and unambiguously distinguish vowel length and certain consonants to aid preachers in reading the homilies aloud to the English-speaking laity. This unusually regular orthography may have been intended to emphasize features of English that Anglo-Norman-speaking canons were likely to mispronounce.

Orrm's main innovation was to employ two consonants to show that the preceding vowel is short, and single consonants when the vowel is long. To conserve manuscript space, Orrm often stacked doubled consonants, as in ⟨cͨ⟩ for ⟨cc⟩ or ⟨rͬ⟩ for ⟨rr⟩, with the novel letters ⟨ꟓ⟩ and ⟨ꟕ⟩ being employed for ⟨þþ⟩ and ⟨ƿƿ⟩, respectively. For syllables ending in vowels, or for special emphasis, he used diacritics to indicate length: a breve for short vowels and an acute accent for long. In addition to his vowel length conventions, Orrm used three distinct letter forms for reflexes of original /ɡ/: insular ⟨ᵹ⟩ for the palatal approximant [j], as in ⟨ᵹiff⟩ [jɪf] 'if'; flat-topped ⟨ꟑ⟩ for the velar stop [ɡ], as in ⟨ꟑoddspell⟩ [ˈɡɔdspɛl] 'gospel'; and Carolingian ⟨g⟩ for the palato-alveolar affricate [d͡ʒ], as in ⟨seggen⟩ [ˈsɛd͡ʒən] 'to say'. He also combined insular ⟨ᵹ⟩ with ⟨h⟩ in two separate configurations: as the digraph ⟨ᵹh⟩ for the voiceless palatal fricative [ç], as in ⟨ᵹho⟩ [çoː] 'she'; and as the stacked grapheme ⟨ᵹͪ⟩, most likely representing a voiced velar fricative ⟨ɣ⟩, as in ⟨eᵹͪe⟩ [ˈeɣə] 'eye'. ⟨ᵹͪ⟩ is the only stacked letter combination that represents a distinct consonant.

His devotion to precise spelling was meticulous. For example, he originally used ⟨eo⟩ and ⟨e⟩ inconsistently for words such as beon and kneow, which had been spelled with ⟨eo⟩ in Old English. At line 13,000 he changed his mind, and went back to change all the ⟨eo⟩ spellings to ⟨e⟩ in the book, so as to reflect the pronunciation (ben and knew).

The combination of this system with a rigid metre, and the stress patterns the metre implies, provides enough information to reconstruct his pronunciation with some precision. Making the reasonable assumption that Orrm's pronunciation was in no way unusual, this permits scholars of the history of English to develop an exceptionally precise snapshot of exactly how Middle English was pronounced in the Midlands in the second half of the twelfth century.

== Significance ==
Orrm's book has a number of innovations that make it valuable. As Bennett points out, Orrm's adaptation of a classical metre with fixed stress patterns anticipates future English poets, who would do much the same when encountering foreign language prosodies. The Ormulum is also the only specimen of the homiletic tradition in England between Ælfric and the fourteenth century, as well as the last example of the Old English verse homily. It also demonstrates what would become Received Standard English two centuries before Geoffrey Chaucer. Further, Orrm was concerned with the laity. He sought to make the Gospel comprehensible to the congregation, and he did this perhaps forty years before the Fourth Council of the Lateran of 1215 "spurred the clergy as a whole into action". At the same time, Orrm's idiosyncrasies and attempted orthographic reform make his work vital for understanding Middle English. The Ormulum is, with the Ancrene Wisse and the Ayenbite of Inwyt, one of the three crucial texts that have enabled philologists to document the transition from Old English to Middle English.

== See also ==
- Allegory in the Middle Ages
- Biblical criticism
- Biblical studies
- List of biblical commentaries
