= Michael E. McCormick =

American engineer

Michael E. McCormick is Corbin A. McNeill Professor emeritus of the Department of Naval Architecture and Ocean Engineering at the U. S. Naval Academy. He is one of the pioneers of modern wave energy research.

He began his career in 1958 as a hydrodynamicist at the U. S. Navy's David Taylor Model Basin. His early work there was in the area of hydroelasticity, working with David A. Jewell. Later, in 1964 his work was in the area of boundary-layer induced vibrations, working with Mark Harrison and Gabriel Boehler. In 1961, he left DTMB and joined the mechanical engineering faculty at Swarthmore College with a one-year appointment. He returned to Swarthmore in 1976 as visiting scholar in engineering. His teaching and research continued at the Catholic University of America, Trinity College (Hartford), the U. S. Naval Academy and Johns Hopkins University. He was at the Naval Academy for 27 years, and at Johns Hopkins as a research professor of civil engineering for 10 years.

McCormick's research efforts also resulted in electrolytic drag reduction of marine vehicles, analysis of ocean wave energy conversion systems and wave-powered desalination of sea water using hinged-raft systems (working with Peter McCabe in Ireland). He also worked with Rameswar Bhattacharyya in co-editing two book series and the journal Ocean Engineering.

McCormick was made a fellow of the American Society of Mechanical Engineers in 2002.

== Education ==
- B.A. (Mathematics & Physics) American University
- M.S.E. (Engineering Mechanics) Catholic University of America
- Ph.D. (Mechanical Engineering) Catholic University of America
- Ph.D. (Civil Engineering) Trinity College, Dublin
- Sc.D. (Engineering-Science) Trinity College, Dublin

== Books ==
- McCormick, Michael (1973), Ocean Engineering Wave Mechanics, Wiley-Interscience, ISBN 0-471-58177-1, 178 pp.
- McCormick, Michael (1983), Ocean Wave Energy Conversion, Wiley-Interscience, ISBN 0-471-08543-X, 256 pp., reissued by Dover in 2007, ISBN 978-0-486-46245-5
- McCormick, Michael (2010), Ocean Engineering Mechanics, Cambridge University, ISBN 978-0-521-85952-3, 573 pp.
