= Tironian notes =

Roman shorthand system

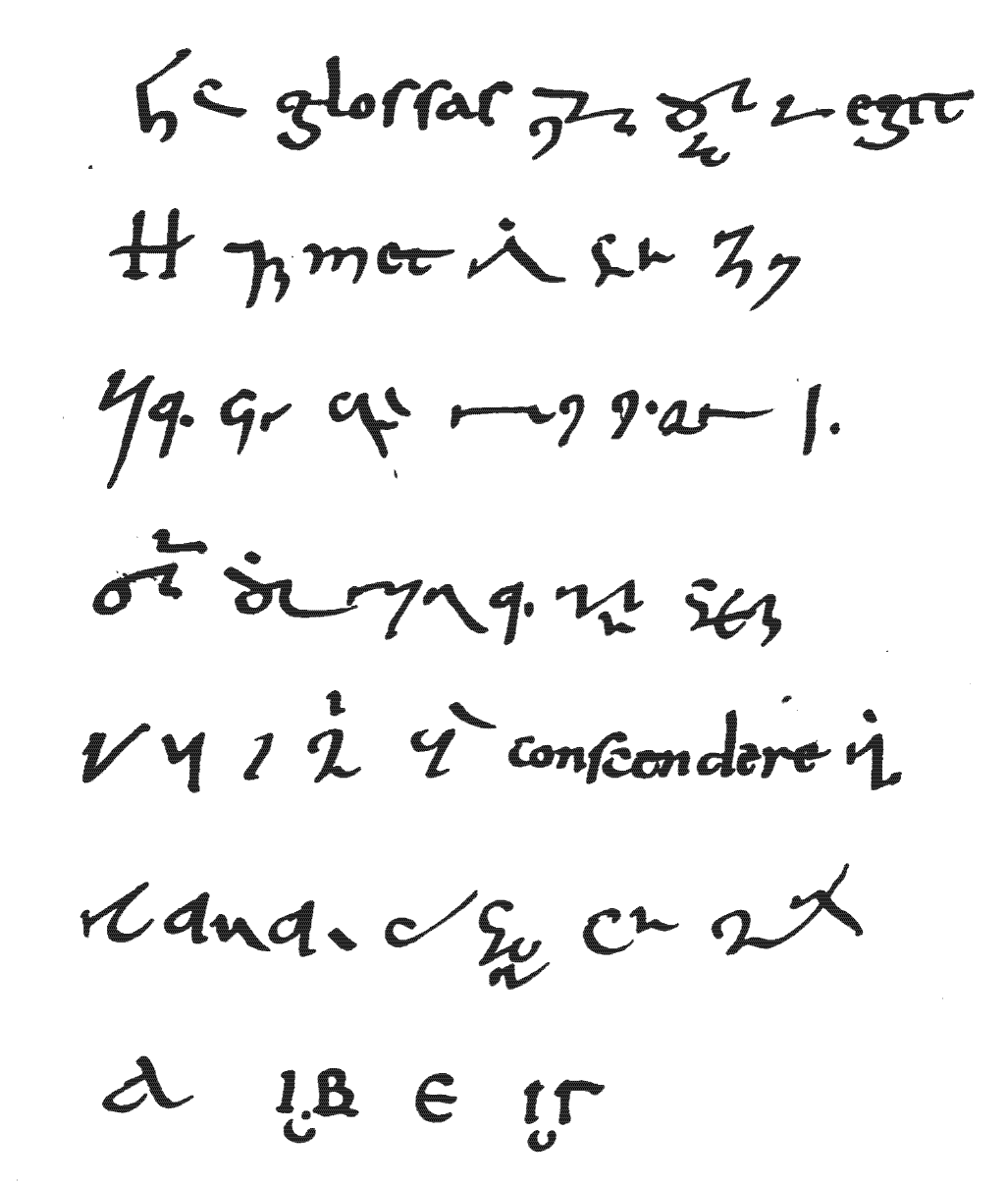
- 9th-century sample
- Script type: shorthand
- Creator: Marcus Tullius Tiro
- Created: 60s BC
- Period: 1st century BC – 16th century AD
- Status: a few Tironian symbols are still in modern use
- Languages: Latin

Unicode
- Unicode range: Et: U+204A, U+2E52; MUFI

Tironian notes (Latin: notae Tironianae) are a form of thousands of signs that were formerly used in a system of shorthand (Tironian shorthand) dating from the 1st century BCE and named after Tiro, a personal secretary to Marcus Tullius Cicero, who is often credited as their inventor. Tiro's system consisted of about 4,000 signs, extended to 5,000 signs by others. During the medieval period, Tiro's notation system was taught in European monasteries and expanded to a total of about 13,000 signs. The use of Tironian notes lasted into the 17th century. A few Tironian signs are still used today.

== Note on sign counts ==
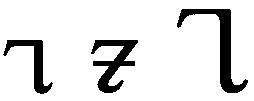
U+204A ⁊ TIRONIAN SIGN ET; with stroke; and capital, U+2E52 ⹒ TIRONIAN SIGN CAPITAL ET

Tironian notes can be themselves composites (ligatures) of simpler Tironian notes, the resulting compound being still shorter than the word it replaces. This accounts in part for the large number of attested Tironian notes, and for the wide variation in estimates of the total number of Tironian notes. Further, the "same" sign can have other variant forms, leading to the same issue.

== History ==
=== Development ===
Before Tironian shorthand became popularized, literature professor Anthony Di Renzo explains, "no true Latin shorthand existed." The only systematized form of abbreviation in Latin was used for legal notations (notae juris). This system, however, was deliberately abstruse and accessible only to people with specialized knowledge. Otherwise, shorthand was improvised for note-taking or writing personal communications, and some of these notations would not have been understood outside of closed circles. Some abbreviations of Latin words and phrases were commonly recognized, such as those of praenomina, and were typically used for inscriptions on monuments.

Scholars infer that Marcus Tullius Cicero (106–43 BC) recognized the need for a comprehensive, standard Latin notation system after learning about the Greek shorthand system. Cicero presumably delegated the task of creating such a system for Latin to his slave and personal secretary Tiro. Tiro's position required him to quickly and accurately transcribe dictations from Cicero, such as speeches, professional and personal correspondence, and business transactions, sometimes while walking through the forum or during fast-paced and contentious government and legal proceedings. Nicknamed "the father of stenography" by historians, Tiro developed a highly refined and accurate method that used Latin letters and abstract symbols to represent prepositions, truncated words, contractions, syllables, and inflections. According to Di Renzo: "Tiro then combined these mixed signs like notes in a score to record not just phrases, but, as Cicero marvels in a letter to Atticus, 'whole sentences.'" Tiro's highly refined and accurate method became the first standardized and widely adopted system of Latin shorthand. The system consisted of abbreviations and abstract symbols, which were either contrived by Tiro or borrowed from Greek shorthand.

Table with examples of Tironian notes which can be modified with various marks to form more complex ideas. A syllable being a consonant followed by a vowel.

=== Controversy ===
Dio Cassius attributes the invention of shorthand to Maecenas, and states that he employed his freedman Aquila in teaching the system to numerous others. Isidore of Seville, however, details another version of the early history of the system, ascribing the invention of the art to Quintus Ennius, who he says invented 1100 marks (Latin: notae). Isidore states that Tiro brought the practice to Rome, but only used Tironian notes for prepositions. According to Plutarch in "Life of Cato the Younger", Cicero's secretaries established the first examples of the art of Latin shorthand:

This only of all Cato's speeches, it is said, was preserved; for Cicero, the consul, had disposed, in various parts of the senate-house, several of the most expert and rapid writers, whom he had taught to make figures comprising numerous words in a few short strokes; as up to that time they had not used those we call short-hand writers, who then, as it is said, established the first example of the art.

=== Introduction ===
There are no surviving copies of Tiro's original manual and code, so knowledge of it is based on biographical records and copies of Tironian tables from the medieval period. Historians typically date the invention of Tiro's system as 63 BC, when it was first used in official government business according to Plutarch in his biography of Cato the Younger in The Lives of the Noble Grecians and Romans. Before Tiro's system was institutionalized, he used it himself as he was developing and fine-tuning it, which historians suspect may have been as early as 75 BC, when Cicero held public office in Sicily and needed his notes and correspondences to be written in code to protect sensitive information he gathered about corruption among other government officials there.

There is evidence that Tiro taught his system to Cicero and his other scribes, and possibly to his friends and family, before it came into wide use. In "Life of Cato the Younger", Plutarch wrote that during Senate hearings in 65 BC relating to the first Catilinarian conspiracy, Tiro and Cicero's other secretaries were in the audience meticulously and rapidly transcribing Cicero's oration. On many of the oldest Tironian tables, lines from this speech were frequently used as examples, leading scholars to theorize it was originally transcribed using Tironian shorthand. Scholars also believe that in preparation for speeches, Tiro drafted outlines in shorthand that Cicero used as notes while speaking.

=== Expansion ===
Isidore tells of the development of additional Tironian notes by various hands, such as Vipsanius, Philargius, and Aquila (as above), until Seneca systematized the various marks to be approximately 5000 in number.

=== Use in the Middle Ages ===
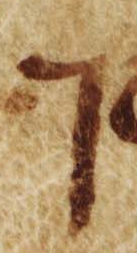
Tironian et in an Anglo-Saxon manuscript

Entering the Middle Ages, Tiro's shorthand was often used in combination with other abbreviations and the original symbols were expanded to 14,000 symbols during the Carolingian dynasty, but it fell out of favor as shorthand and was forgotten until interest was rekindled by Thomas Becket, archbishop of Canterbury, in the 12th century. In the 15th century Johannes Trithemius, abbot of the Benedictine abbey of Sponheim in Germany, discovered the notae Benenses: a psalm and a Ciceronian lexicon written in Tironian shorthand.

In Old English manuscripts, the Tironian et served as both a phonetic and morphological place holder. A Tironian et represented the sound-sequence /ɑnd/. On its own, this could represent the Old English word and /ɑnd/, which meant 'and' (it is indeed the ancestor to modern and /ænd/). However, the Tironian et could be used within other words in the same way: for instance, if it followed l (thus written as l⁊), then it would represent land instead of let (both same as modern). This additional function as a phonetic as well as a conjunction placeholder has escaped formal Modern English; for example, one may not spell the word land as l& (although this occurs in an informal style practised on certain Internet forums and sometimes in texting and other forms of instant messaging). This practice was distinct from the occasional use of &c. for etc., where the & is interpreted as the Latin word et ('and') and the c. is an abbreviation for Latin cetera ('[the] rest').

=== Recent historic use ===
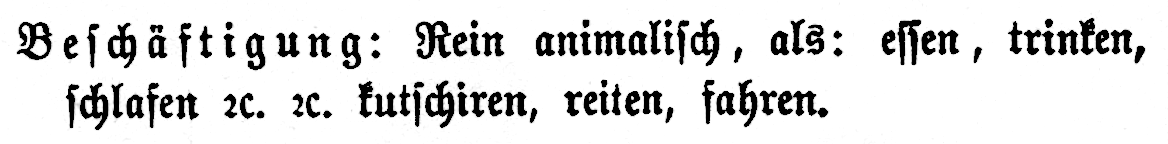
R rotunda ⟨ꝛ⟩ substituting for Tironian ⁊ in the abbreviation etc. in a German print from 1845 (ꝛc replacing ⁊c).

In blackletter texts (especially in German printing), it was still used in the abbreviation ⁊c. meaning etc. (for et cetera) throughout the 19th century. However, as not all typesets included a sort for the ⟨⁊⟩ character, the similar R rotunda ⟨ꝛ⟩ was substituted (which produced ꝛc.).

=== Current use ===
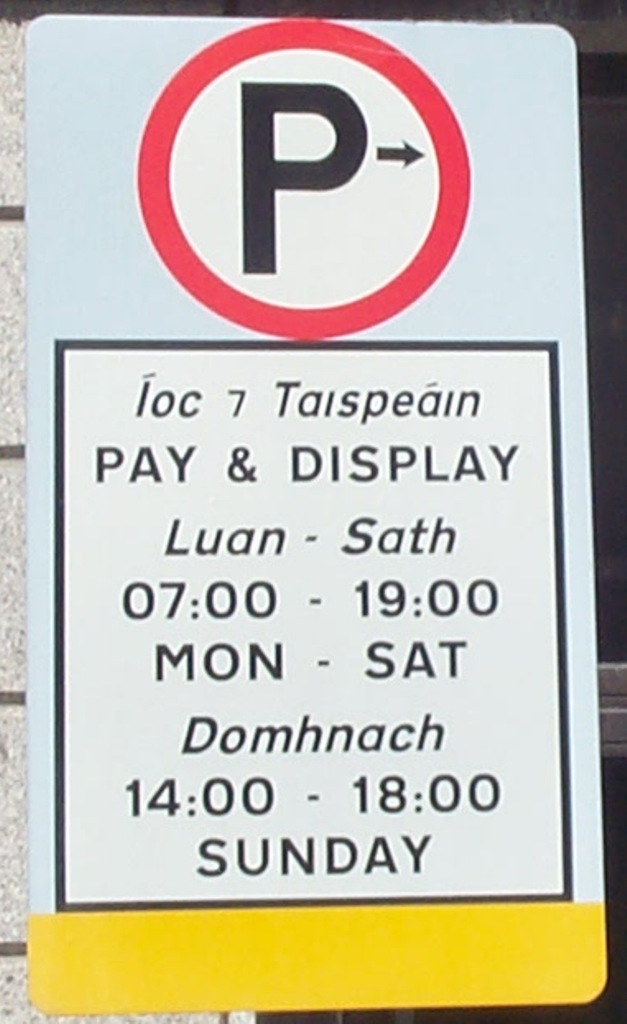
A bilingual pay and display sign in Dublin with the Tironian et for the Irish agus ('and').

Just one Tironian symbol remains in common use today, the Tironian et (⁊, equivalent to &), used in Ireland and Scotland to mean and (where it is called agus in Irish and agusan in Scottish Gaelic).

== Support on computers ==
The Tironian character set has limited support in Unicode. The et ⟨⁊⟩ is among the few that are included, because of its continued use as an ampersand in Insular script and then in Gaelic type. A number of other Tironian signs have been assigned to the Private Use Area of Unicode by the Medieval Unicode Font Initiative (MUFI).

The Tironian et has a Unicode codepoint at U+204A ⁊ TIRONIAN SIGN ET, and displays (e.g. for documents written in Irish or Scottish Gaelic) on all common operating systems. Most modern Unicode fonts include a glyph for this grapheme. Commercially available computer fonts for Gaelic type should contain the glyph in a design that is consistent with the rest of the typeface.

Some applications and websites, such as the online edition of the Dictionary of the Irish Language, substitute the Tironian et with the box-drawing character U+2510 ┐ BOX DRAWINGS LIGHT DOWN AND LEFT, probably because it looks similar and was available before Unicode. The numeral 7 is also used in informal contexts such as Internet forums and occasionally in print.

== Gallery ==
"Letter of Consolation for Departing Warriors", 9th century

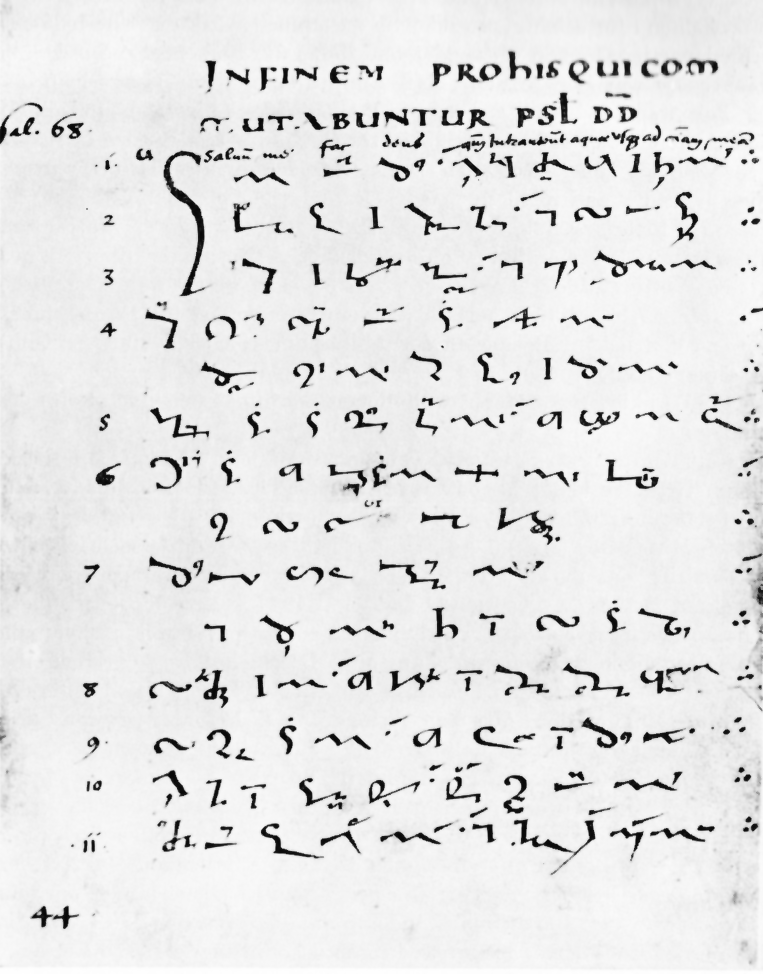
Psalm 68. Manuscript, 9th century

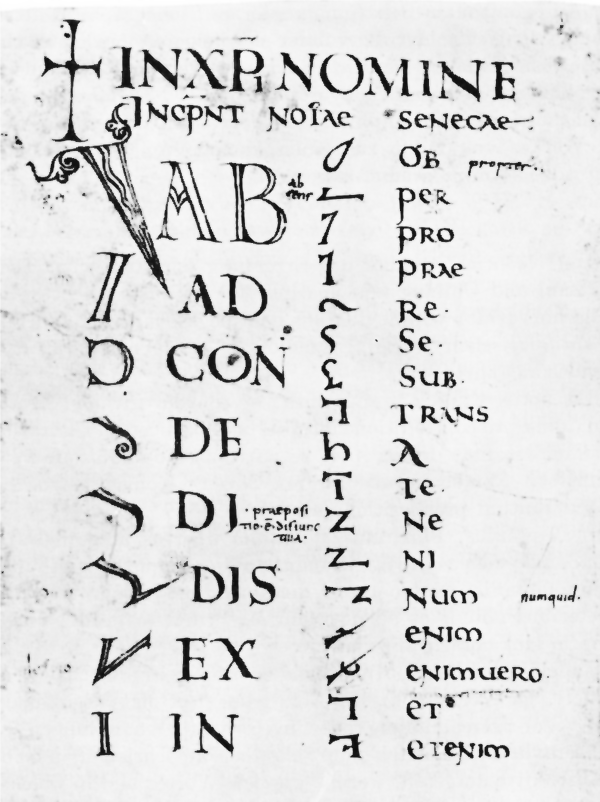
Tironian note glossary from the 8th century, codex Casselanus. "Notae Senecae", Seneca's notes.

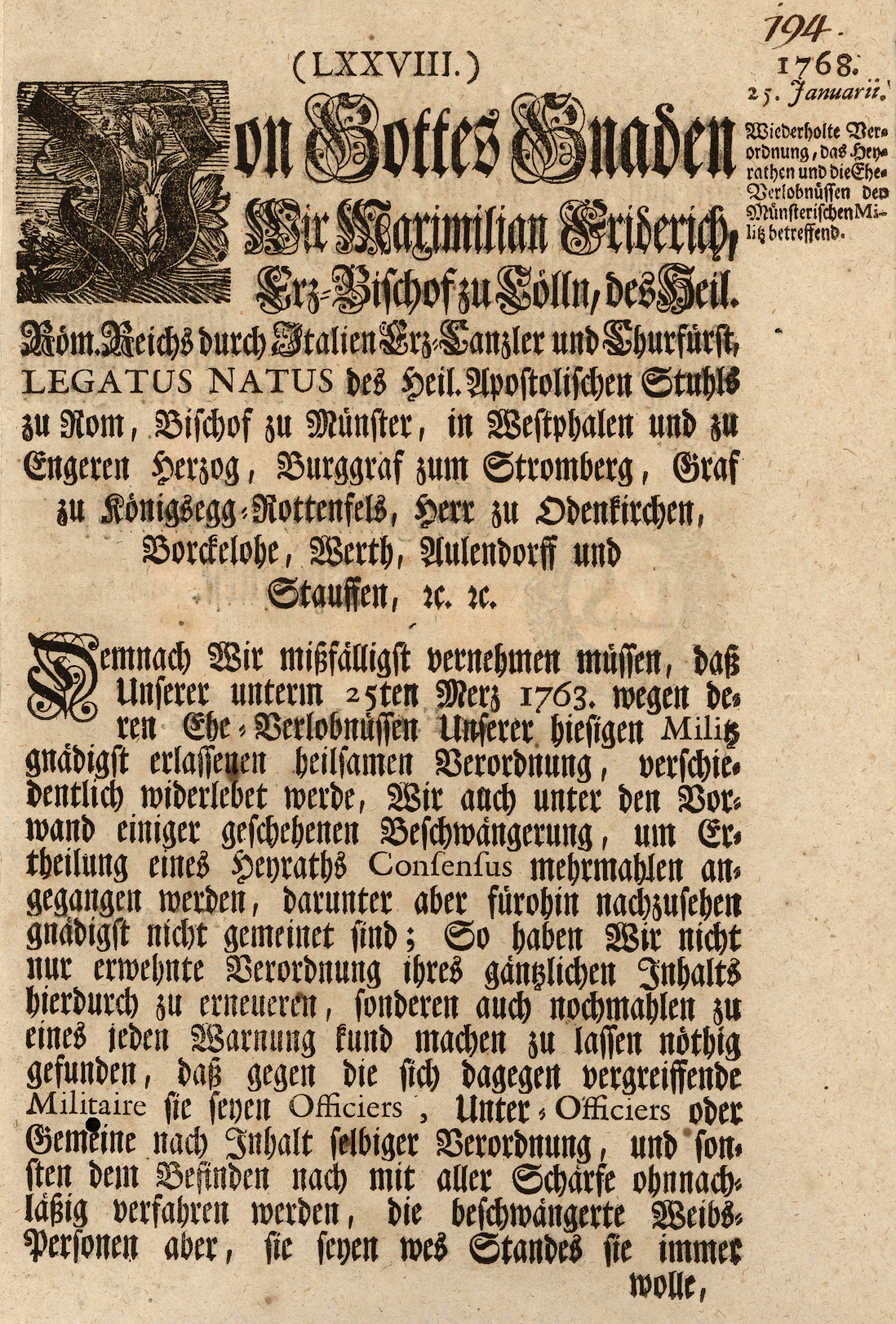
R rotunda substituting for Tironian et in the abbreviation etc. at the end of the nobility title list. 1768

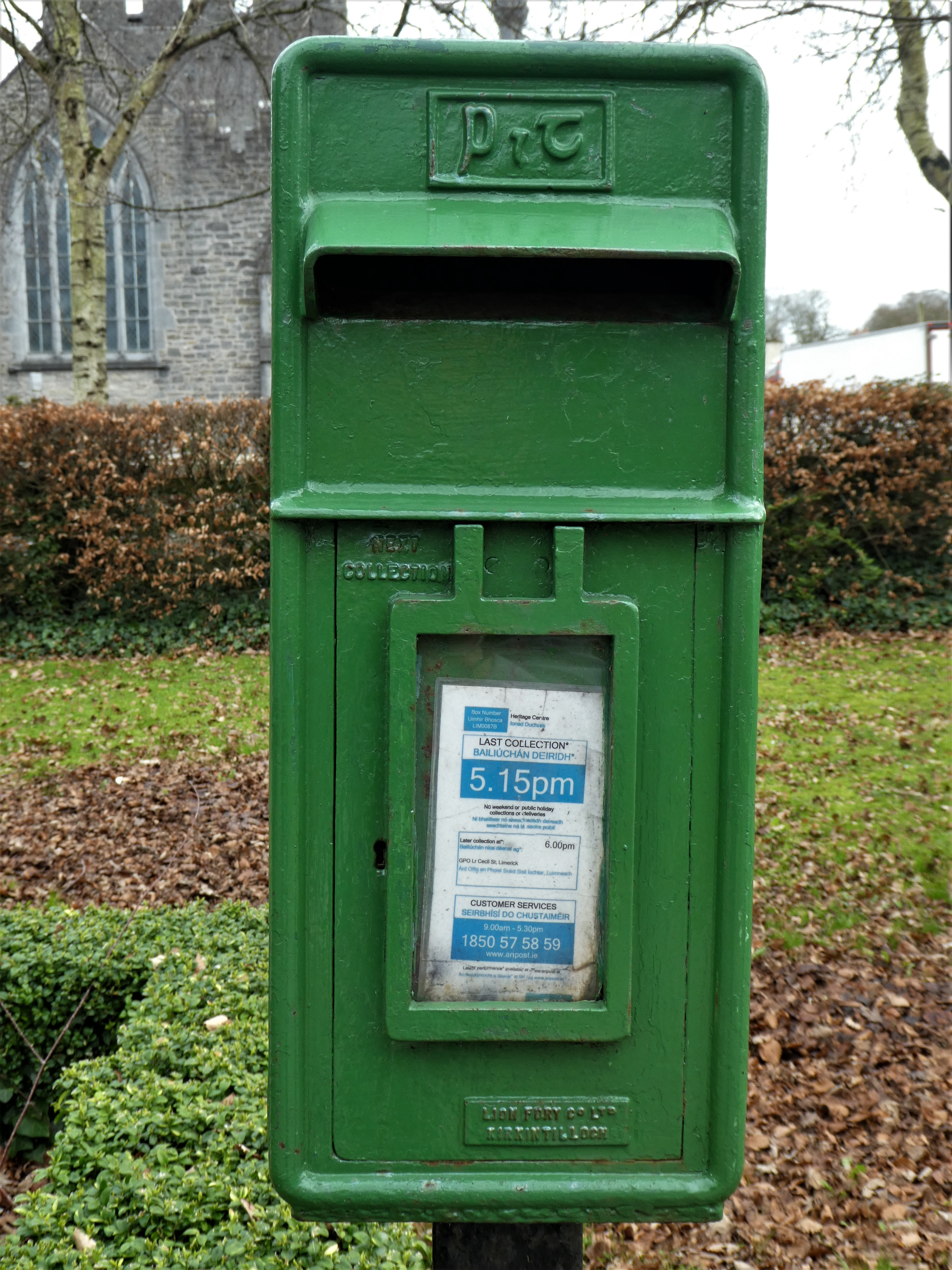
Irish Green postbox at Adare, County Limerick, with the P⁊Ꞇ (P&T) logo

== See also ==
- Ampersand
- Gaelic script
- Scribal abbreviation
