= Combining Diacritical Marks Supplement =

- Range: U+1DC0..U+1DFF (64 code points)
- Plane: BMP
- Scripts: Inherited
- Major alphabets: UPA
- Symbol sets: Medieval letter diacritics
- Assigned: 64 code points
- Unused: 0 reserved code points

Unicode version history
- 4.1 (2005): 4 (+4)
- 5.0 (2006): 13 (+9)
- 5.1 (2008): 41 (+28)
- 5.2 (2009): 42 (+1)
- 6.0 (2010): 43 (+1)
- 7.0 (2014): 58 (+15)
- 9.0 (2016): 59 (+1)
- 10.0 (2017): 63 (+4)
- 14.0 (2021): 64 (+1)

Unicode documentation
- Code chart ∣ Web page

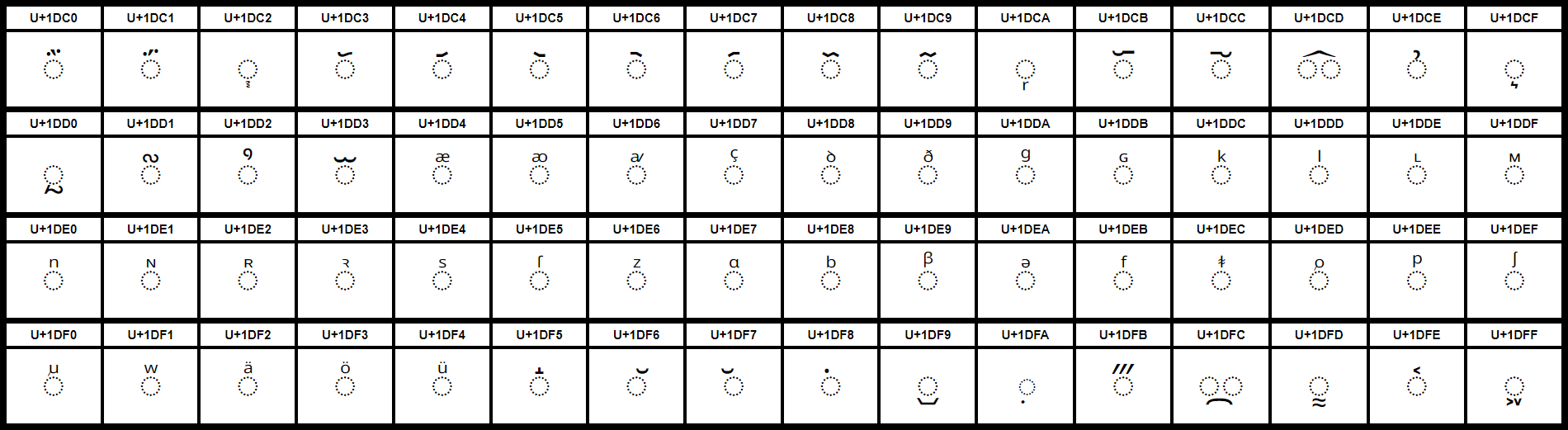
Graphical representation of the Combining Diacritical Marks Supplement Unicode block

Combining Diacritical Marks Supplement is a Unicode block containing combining characters for the Uralic Phonetic Alphabet, Medievalist notations, and German dialectology (Teuthonista). It is an extension of the diacritic characters found in the Combining Diacritical Marks block.

== Block ==
Combining Diacritical Marks Supplement^{[1]} Official Unicode Consortium code chart (PDF)
	0	1	2	3	4	5	6	7	8	9	A	B	C	D	E	F
U+1DCx	◌᷀	◌᷁	◌᷂	◌᷃	◌᷄	◌᷅	◌᷆	◌᷇	◌᷈	◌᷉	◌᷊	◌᷋	◌᷌	◌᷍	◌᷎	◌᷏
U+1DDx	◌᷐	◌᷑	◌᷒	◌ᷓ	◌ᷔ	◌ᷕ	◌ᷖ	◌ᷗ	◌ᷘ	◌ᷙ	◌ᷚ	◌ᷛ	◌ᷜ	◌ᷝ	◌ᷞ	◌ᷟ
U+1DEx	◌ᷠ	◌ᷡ	◌ᷢ	◌ᷣ	◌ᷤ	◌ᷥ	◌ᷦ	◌ᷧ	◌ᷨ	◌ᷩ	◌ᷪ	◌ᷫ	◌ᷬ	◌ᷭ	◌ᷮ	◌ᷯ
U+1DFx	◌ᷰ	◌ᷱ	◌ᷲ	◌ᷳ	◌ᷴ	◌᷵	◌᷶	◌᷷	◌᷸	◌᷹	◌᷺	◌᷻	◌᷼	◌᷽	◌᷾	◌᷿
Notes: 1. As of Unicode version 16.0

== History ==
The following Unicode-related documents record the purpose and process of defining specific characters in the Combining Diacritical Marks Supplement block:

Version	Final code points (Note: Proposed code points and characters names may differ from final code points and names)	Count	L2 ID	WG2 ID	Document
4.1	U+1DC0..1DC1	2	L2/02-031		Anderson, Deborah (2002-01-21), TLG Miscellanea Proposal
4.1	U+1DC0..1DC1	2	L2/02-033		Anderson, Deborah (2002-01-21), TLG Unicode Proposal (draft)
4.1	U+1DC0..1DC1	2	L2/02-053		Anderson, Deborah (2002-02-04), Description of TLG Documents
4.1	U+1DC0..1DC1	2	L2/02-273		Pantelia, Maria (2002-07-31), TLG Unicode Proposal
4.1	U+1DC0..1DC1	2	L2/02-287		Pantelia, Maria (2002-08-09), Proposal Summary Form accompanying TLG Unicode Proposal (L2/02-273)
4.1	U+1DC0..1DC1	2	L2/02-312R		Pantelia, Maria (2002-11-07), Proposal to encode additional Greek editorial and punctuation characters in the UCS
4.1	U+1DC0..1DC1	2	L2/03-324	N2642	Pantelia, Maria (2003-10-06), Proposal to encode additional Greek editorial and punctuation characters in the UCS
4.1	U+1DC0..1DC1	2	L2/04-132	N2740	Constable, Peter (2004-04-19), Proposal to add additional phonetic characters to the UCS
4.1	U+1DC2	1	L2/03-190R		Constable, Peter (2003-06-08), Proposal to Encode Additional Phonetic Symbols in the UCS
4.1	U+1DC2	1	L2/04-047		Constable, Peter (2004-02-01), Revised Proposal to Encode Additional Phonetic Symbols in the UCS
4.1	U+1DC2	1	L2/04-132	N2740	Constable, Peter (2004-04-19), Proposal to add additional phonetic characters to the UCS
4.1	U+1DC2	1	L2/04-003R		Moore, Lisa (2004-05-17), "Additional Phonetic Symbols (B.14.13)", UTC #98 Minutes
4.1	U+1DC3	1	L2/04-051		Anderson, Deborah (2004-01-29), Comments on 2619R Final Glagolitic proposal
4.1	U+1DC3	1	L2/04-171	N2763	Everson, Michael (2004-05-29), Proposal to add COMBINING GLAGOLITIC SUSPENSION MARK to the BMP of the UCS
5.0	U+1DC4..1DCA	7	L2/04-246R		Priest, Lorna (2004-07-26), Revised Proposal for Additional Latin Phonetic and Orthographic Characters
5.0	U+1DC4..1DCA	7	L2/04-316		Moore, Lisa (2004-08-19), "C.6", UTC #100 Minutes
5.0	U+1DC4..1DCA	7	L2/04-348	N2906	Priest, Lorna (2004-08-23), Revised Proposal for Additional Latin Phonetic and Orthographic Characters
5.0	U+1DFE..1DFF	2	L2/05-189	N2958	Lehtiranta, Juhani; Ruppel, Klaas; Suutari, Toni; Trosterud, Trond (2005-07-22), Report on progress in implementing the Uralic Phonetic Alphabet with indication of the need for additional characters and symbols
5.0	U+1DFE..1DFF	2	L2/05-261	N2989	Ruppel, Klaas; Kolehmainen, Erkki I.; Everson, Michael; Freytag, Asmus; Whistler, Ken (2005-09-13), Proposal to add six additional Uralicist characters to the UCS
5.0	U+1DFE..1DFF	2	L2/05-270		Whistler, Ken (2005-09-21), "A. Uralicist character additions", WG2 Consent Docket (Sophia Antipolis)
5.0	U+1DFE..1DFF	2	L2/05-279		Moore, Lisa (2005-11-10), "Consensus 105-C29", UTC #105 Minutes
5.0	U+1DFE..1DFF	2		N2953 (pdf, doc)	Umamaheswaran, V. S. (2006-02-16), "7.4.7", Unconfirmed minutes of WG 2 meeting 47, Sophia Antipolis, France; 2005-09-12/15
5.1	U+1DCB..1DCC	2	L2/06-214	N3048	Proposal to encode two combining characters in the UCS, 2006-03-02
5.1	U+1DCB..1DCC	2	L2/06-108		Moore, Lisa (2006-05-25), "Consensus 107-C35", UTC #107 Minutes
5.1	U+1DCB..1DCC	2		N3103 (pdf, doc)	Umamaheswaran, V. S. (2006-08-25), "M48.17", Unconfirmed minutes of WG 2 meeting 48, Mountain View, CA, USA; 2006-04-24/27
5.1	U+1DCD..1DE6	26	L2/05-183	N2957	Everson, Michael; Haugen, Odd Einar; Emiliano, António; Pedro, Susana; Grammel, Florian; Baker, Peter; Stötzner, Andreas; Dohnicht, Marcus; Luft, Diana (2005-08-02), Preliminary proposal to add medievalist characters to the UCS
5.1	U+1DCD..1DE6	26	L2/06-027	N3027	Everson, Michael; Baker, Peter; Emiliano, António; Grammel, Florian; Haugen, Odd Einar; Luft, Diana; Pedro, Susana; Schumacher, Gerd; Stötzner, Andreas (2006-01-30), Proposal to add Medievalist characters to the UCS
5.1	U+1DCD..1DE6	26	L2/06-049		Pedro, Susana (2006-01-31), Letter of support for Medievalist letters (L2/06-027)
5.1	U+1DCD..1DE6	26	L2/06-048		Emiliano, Antonio (2006-02-02), Letter of support for Medievalist letters (L2/06-027)
5.1	U+1DCD..1DE6	26	L2/06-008R2		Moore, Lisa (2006-02-13), "C.14", UTC #106 Minutes
5.1	U+1DCD..1DE6	26		N2953 (pdf, doc)	Umamaheswaran, V. S. (2006-02-16), "7.4.6", Unconfirmed minutes of WG 2 meeting 47, Sophia Antipolis, France; 2005-09-12/15
5.1	U+1DCD..1DE6	26	L2/06-074R	N3039R	Feedback on N3027 Proposal to add Medievalist Characters, 2006-03-16
5.1	U+1DCD..1DE6	26	L2/06-101	N3060	Feedback on N3027 "Proposal to add medievalist characters to the UCS", 2006-03-27
5.1	U+1DCD..1DE6	26	L2/06-116	N3077	Everson, Michael; Baker, Peter; Emiliano, António; Grammel, Florian; Haugen, Odd Einar; Luft, Diana; Pedro, Susana; Schumacher, Gerd; Stötzner, Andreas (2006-03-31), Response to UTC/US contribution N3037R, "Feedback on N3027 Proposal to add medievalist characters"
5.1	U+1DCD..1DE6	26	L2/06-108		Moore, Lisa (2006-05-25), "Consensus 107-C36", UTC #107 Minutes
5.1	U+1DCD..1DE6	26		N3103 (pdf, doc)	Umamaheswaran, V. S. (2006-08-25), "M48.14", Unconfirmed minutes of WG 2 meeting 48, Mountain View, CA, USA; 2006-04-24/27
5.1	U+1DCD..1DE6	26	L2/06-318	N3160	Response to Project Editor's contribution N3146, "Draft disposition of comments on SC2 N3875 (PDAM text for Amendment 3.2 to ISO/IEC 10646:2003)", 2006-09-21
5.2	U+1DFD	1	L2/07-334R2	N3447	Priest, Lorna (2007-10-15), Proposal to encode two phonetic characters and two Shona characters
5.2	U+1DFD	1	L2/07-345		Moore, Lisa (2007-10-25), "C.4", UTC #113 Minutes
5.2	U+1DFD	1	L2/08-318	N3453 (pdf, doc)	Umamaheswaran, V. S. (2008-08-13), "M52.20f", Unconfirmed minutes of WG 2 meeting 52
6.0	U+1DFC	1	L2/09-028	N3571	Ruppel, Klaas; Aalto, Tero; Everson, Michael (2009-01-27), Proposal to encode additional characters for the Uralic Phonetic Alphabet
6.0	U+1DFC	1	L2/09-234	N3603 (pdf, doc)	Umamaheswaran, V. S. (2009-07-08), "M54.13g", Unconfirmed minutes of WG 2 meeting 54
6.0	U+1DFC	1	L2/09-104		Moore, Lisa (2009-05-20), "Consensus 119-C27", UTC #119 / L2 #216 Minutes
7.0	U+1DE7..1DF4	14	L2/08-428	N3555	Everson, Michael (2008-11-27), Exploratory proposal to encode Germanicist, Nordicist, and other phonetic characters in the UCS
7.0	U+1DE7..1DF4	14	L2/10-346	N3907	Everson, Michael; Wandl-Vogt, Eveline; Dicklberger, Alois (2010-09-23), Preliminary proposal to encode "Teuthonista" phonetic characters in the UCS
7.0	U+1DE7..1DF4	14	L2/11-137	N4031	Everson, Michael; Wandl-Vogt, Eveline; Dicklberger, Alois (2011-05-09), Proposal to encode "Teuthonista" phonetic characters in the UCS
7.0	U+1DE7..1DF4	14	L2/11-203	N4082	Everson, Michael; et al. (2011-05-27), Support for "Teuthonista" encoding proposal
7.0	U+1DE7..1DF4	14	L2/11-202	N4081	Everson, Michael; Dicklberger, Alois; Pentzlin, Karl; Wandl-Vogt, Eveline (2011-06-02), Revised proposal to encode "Teuthonista" phonetic characters in the UCS
7.0	U+1DE7..1DF4	14	L2/11-240	N4106	Everson, Michael; Pentzlin, Karl (2011-06-09), Report on the ad hoc re "Teuthonista" (SC2/WG2 N4081) held during the SC2/WG2 meeting at Helsinki
7.0	U+1DE7..1DF4	14	L2/11-261R2		Moore, Lisa (2011-08-16), "Consensus 128-C38", UTC #128 / L2 #225 Minutes, "Approve 85 characters for German dialectology..."
7.0	U+1DE7..1DF4	14		N4103	"11.16 Teuthonista phonetic characters", Unconfirmed minutes of WG 2 meeting 58, 2012-01-03
7.0	U+1DE7..1DF4	14	L2/12-269	N4296	Request to change the names of three Teuthonista characters under ballot, 2012-07-26
7.0	U+1DF5	1	L2/12-209R	N4279R	Everson, Michael; Starner, David (2012-07-31), Proposal to add COMBINING UP TACK ABOVE to the UCS
7.0	U+1DF5	1	L2/12-239		Moore, Lisa (2012-08-14), "C.5", UTC #132 Minutes
9.0	U+1DFB	1	L2/12-349		Manandhar, Dev Dass; Karmacharya, Samir; Chitrakar, Bishnu (2012-10-29), Proposal for the Nepaalalipi script in the UCS
9.0	U+1DFB	1	L2/12-390		Anderson, Deborah (2012-11-08), Comparison between Newar and Nepaalalipi proposals (L2/12-003 and L2/12-349)
9.0	U+1DFB	1	L2/14-253		Anderson, Deborah (2014-10-06), Recommendations to UTC from Script Meeting in Nepal
9.0	U+1DFB	1	L2/14-250		Moore, Lisa (2014-11-10), "Consensus 141-C25", UTC #141 Minutes
9.0	U+1DFB	1	L2/14-285R3	N4660	Whistler, Ken (2014-12-04), Towards a Consensus Encoding of Newa
10.0	U+1DF6..1DF9	4	L2/15-173		Andreev, Aleksandr; Shardt, Yuri; Simmons, Nikita (2015-07-29), Proposal to Encode some Additional Symbols used in Church Slavonic Text
10.0	U+1DF6..1DF9	4	L2/15-187		Moore, Lisa (2015-08-11), "E.2", UTC #144 Minutes
10.0	U+1DF6..1DF9	4		N4739	"M64.06", Unconfirmed minutes of WG 2 meeting 64, 2016-08-31
14.0	U+1DFA	1	L2/19-338		Kiraz, Sebastian Kenoro; Kiraz, George (2019-11-21), Expanding the "Syriac Supplement" U+0860 Block for historical glyphs and marks
14.0	U+1DFA	1	L2/19-343		Anderson, Deborah; Whistler, Ken; Pournader, Roozbeh; Moore, Lisa; Liang, Hai (2019-10-06), "8. Syriac", Recommendations to UTC #161 October 2019 on Script Proposals
14.0	U+1DFA	1	L2/20-019		Yang, Ben; Kiraz, Sebastian Kenoro; Kiraz, George (2020-01-07), Proposal to encode COMBINING DOT BELOW LEFT for Syriac
14.0	U+1DFA	1	L2/20-046		Anderson, Deborah; Whistler, Ken; Pournader, Roozbeh; Moore, Lisa; Liang, Hai (2020-01-10), "6. Syriac", Recommendations to UTC #162 January 2020 on Script Proposals
14.0	U+1DFA	1	L2/20-015R		Moore, Lisa (2020-05-14), "C.9 Proposal to encode COMBINING DOT BELOW LEFT for Syriac", Draft Minutes of UTC Meeting 162
