= Combining Diacritical Marks Extended =

- Range: U+1AB0..U+1AFF (80 code points)
- Plane: BMP
- Scripts: Inherited
- Assigned: 65 code points
- Unused: 15 reserved code points

Unicode Version History
- 7.0 (2014): 15 (+15)
- 13.0 (2020): 17 (+2)
- 14.0 (2021): 31 (+14)
- 17.0 (2025): 58 (+27)
- 18.0 (2026): 65 (+7)

Unicode documentation
- Code chart ∣ Web page

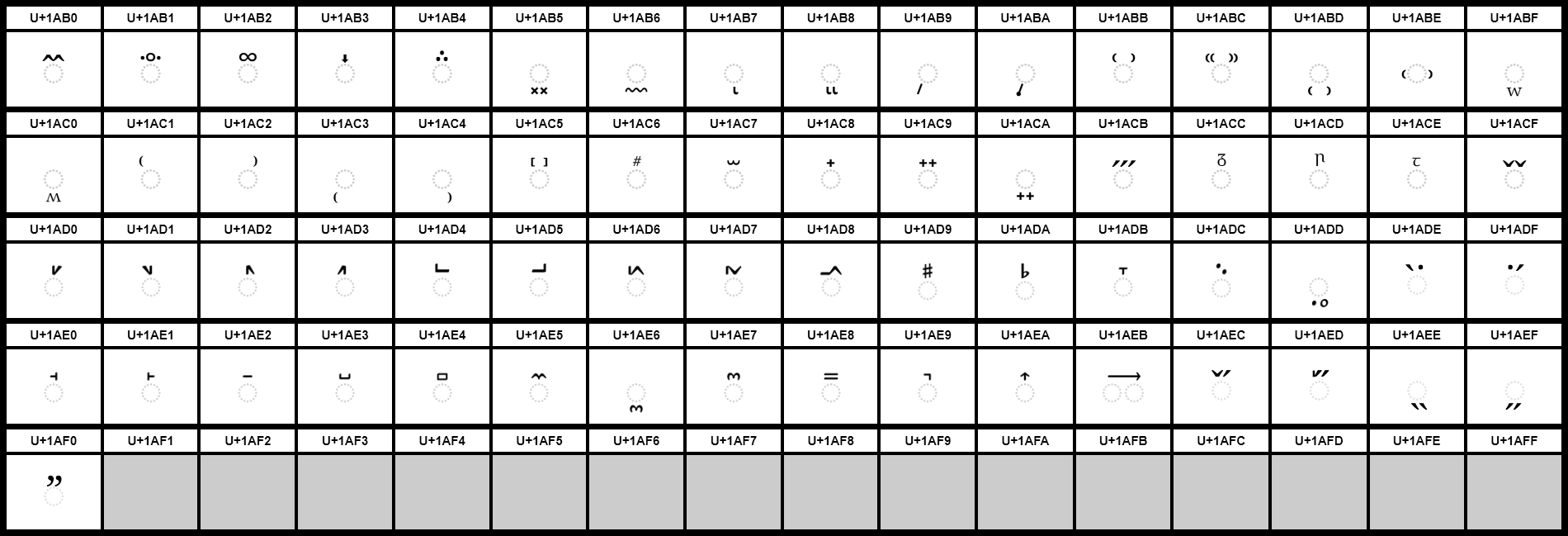
Graphical representation of the Combining Diacritical Marks Extended Unicode block.

Combining Diacritical Marks Extended is a Unicode block containing diacritical marks used in German dialectology (Teuthonista).

== Block ==
Combining Diacritical Marks Extended^{[1]}^{[2]} Official Unicode Consortium code chart (PDF)
| | 0 | 1 | 2 | 3 | 4 | 5 | 6 | 7 | 8 | 9 | A | B | C | D | E | F |
| U+1ABx | ◌᪰ | ◌᪱ | ◌᪲ | ◌᪳ | ◌᪴ | ◌᪵ | ◌᪶ | ◌᪷ | ◌᪸ | ◌᪹ | ◌᪺ | ◌᪻ | ◌᪼ | ◌᪽ | ◌᪾ | ◌ᪿ |
| U+1ACx | ◌ᫀ | ◌᫁ | ◌᫂ | ◌᫃ | ◌᫄ | ◌᫅ | ◌᫆ | ◌᫇ | ◌᫈ | ◌᫉ | ◌᫊ | ◌᫋ | ◌ᫌ | ◌ᫍ | ◌ᫎ | ◌᫏ |
| U+1ADx | ◌᫐ | ◌᫑ | ◌᫒ | ◌᫓ | ◌᫔ | ◌᫕ | ◌᫖ | ◌᫗ | ◌᫘ | ◌᫙ | ◌᫚ | ◌᫛ | ◌᫜ | ◌᫝ | ◌᫞ | ◌᫟ |
| U+1AEx | ◌᫠ | ◌᫡ | ◌᫢ | ◌᫣ | ◌᫤ | ◌᫥ | ◌᫦ | ◌᫧ | ◌᫨ | ◌᫩ | ◌᫪ | ◌᫫ | ◌᫬ | ◌᫭ | ◌᫮ | ◌᫯ |
| U+1AFx | ◌᫰ | | | | | | | | | | | | | | | |
Notes 1.As of Unicode version 18.0 2.Grey areas indicate non-assigned code points

== History ==
The following Unicode-related documents record the purpose and process of defining specific characters in the Combining Diacritical Marks Extended block:

| Version | Final code points (Note: Proposed code points and characters names may differ from final code points and names) | Count | L2 ID | WG2 ID | Document |
|---|---|---|---|---|---|
| 7.0 | U+1AB0..1ABE | 15 | L2/08-428 | N3555 | Everson, Michael (2008-11-27), Exploratory proposal to encode Germanicist, Nordicist, and other phonetic characters in the UCS |
| 7.0 | U+1AB0..1ABE | 15 | L2/10-346 | N3907 | Everson, Michael; Wandl-Vogt, Eveline; Dicklberger, Alois (2010-09-23), Preliminary proposal to encode "Teuthonista" phonetic characters in the UCS |
| 7.0 | U+1AB0..1ABE | 15 | L2/11-137 | N4031 | Everson, Michael; Wandl-Vogt, Eveline; Dicklberger, Alois (2011-05-09), Proposal to encode "Teuthonista" phonetic characters in the UCS |
| 7.0 | U+1AB0..1ABE | 15 | L2/11-203 | N4082 | Everson, Michael; et al. (2011-05-27), Support for "Teuthonista" encoding proposal |
| 7.0 | U+1AB0..1ABE | 15 | L2/11-202 | N4081 | Everson, Michael; Dicklberger, Alois; Pentzlin, Karl; Wandl-Vogt, Eveline (2011-06-02), Revised proposal to encode "Teuthonista" phonetic characters in the UCS |
| 7.0 | U+1AB0..1ABE | 15 | L2/11-240 | N4106 | Everson, Michael; Pentzlin, Karl (2011-06-09), Report on the ad hoc re "Teuthonista" (SC2/WG2 N4081) held during the SC2/WG2 meeting at Helsinki |
| 7.0 | U+1AB0..1ABE | 15 | L2/11-261R2 | | Moore, Lisa (2011-08-16), "Consensus 128-C38", UTC #128 / L2 #225 Minutes, "Approve 85 characters for German dialectology..." |
| 7.0 | U+1AB0..1ABE | 15 | | N4103 | "11.16 Teuthonista phonetic characters", Unconfirmed minutes of WG 2 meeting 58, 2012-01-03 |
| 7.0 | U+1AB0..1ABE | 15 | L2/12-269 | N4296 | Request to change the names of three Teuthonista characters under ballot, 2012-07-26 |
| 13.0 | U+1ABF..1AC0 | 2 | L2/19-075R | N5036R | Everson, Michael (2019-05-05), Proposal to add six phonetic characters for Scots to the UCS |
| 13.0 | U+1ABF..1AC0 | 2 | L2/19-173 | | Anderson, Deborah; et al. (2019-04-29), "Phonetic characters for Scots", Recommendations to UTC #159 April-May 2019 on Script Proposals |
| 13.0 | U+1ABF..1AC0 | 2 | L2/19-122 | | Moore, Lisa (2019-05-08), "C.6", UTC #159 Minutes |
| 13.0 | U+1ABF..1AC0 | 2 | | N5122 | "M68.05", Unconfirmed minutes of WG 2 meeting 68, 2019-12-31 |
| 13.0 | U+1ABF..1AC0 | 2 | L2/20-052 | | Pournader, Roozbeh (2020-01-15), Changes to Identifier_Type of some Unicode 13.0 characters |
| 13.0 | U+1ABF..1AC0 | 2 | L2/20-015R | | Moore, Lisa (2020-05-14), "B.13.4 Changes to Identifier_Type of some Unicode 13.0 characters", Draft Minutes of UTC Meeting 162 |
| 14.0 | U+1AC1..1AC4 | 4 | L2/20-039 | | Miller, Kirk; Ball, Martin (2020-01-08), Unicode request for extIPA support |
| 14.0 | U+1AC1..1AC4 | 4 | L2/20-046 | | Anderson, Deborah; Whistler, Ken; Pournader, Roozbeh; Moore, Lisa; Liang, Hai (2020-01-10), "1a. Extended IPA", Recommendations to UTC #162 January 2020 on Script Proposals |
| 14.0 | U+1AC1..1AC4 | 4 | L2/20-116 | | Miller, Kirk; Ball, Martin (2020-04-14), Expansion of the extIPA and VoQS |
| 14.0 | U+1AC1..1AC4 | 4 | L2/20-105 | | Anderson, Deborah; Whistler, Ken; Pournader, Roozbeh; Moore, Lisa; Constable, Peter; Liang, Hai (2020-04-20), "1a. Extended IPA and VoQS", Recommendations to UTC #163 April 2020 on Script Proposals |
| 14.0 | U+1AC1..1AC4 | 4 | L2/20-116R | | Miller, Kirk; Ball, Martin (2020-07-11), Expansion of the extIPA and VoQS |
| 14.0 | U+1AC1..1AC4 | 4 | L2/20-169 | | Anderson, Deborah; Whistler, Ken; Pournader, Roozbeh; Moore, Lisa; Constable, Peter; Liang, Hai (2020-07-21), "3b. Expansion of the extIPA and VoQS", Recommendations to UTC #164 July 2020 on Script Proposals |
| 14.0 | U+1AC1..1AC4 | 4 | L2/20-172 | | Moore, Lisa (2020-08-03), "Consensus 164-C9", UTC #164 Minutes |
| 14.0 | U+1AC1..1AC4 | 4 | L2/21-021 | | Anderson, Deborah (2020-12-07), Reference doc numbers for L2/20-266R "Consolidated code chart of proposed phonetic characters" and IPA etc. code point and name changes |
| 14.0 | U+1AC1..1AC4 | 4 | L2/21-009 | | Moore, Lisa (2021-01-27), "B.1 — 3a. Phonetic characters", UTC #166 Minutes |
| 14.0 | U+1AC5, 1AC7..1ACA | 5 | L2/21-042 | | Miller, Kirk (2021-01-11), Unicode request for phonetic punctuation & diacritics |
| 14.0 | U+1AC5, 1AC7..1ACA | 5 | L2/21-016R | | Anderson, Deborah; Whistler, Ken; Pournader, Roozbeh; Moore, Lisa; Liang, Hai (2021-01-14), "3g. Phonetic Punctuation and Diacritics", Recommendations to UTC #166 January 2021 on Script Proposals |
| 14.0 | U+1AC5, 1AC7..1ACA | 5 | L2/21-009 | | Moore, Lisa (2021-01-27), "B.1 — 3g. Phonetic Punctuation and Diacritics", UTC #166 Minutes |
| 14.0 | U+1AC5, 1AC7..1ACA | 5 | L2/21-069R | | Scherer, Markus; Davis, Mark; Freytag, Asmus; Chapman, Christopher; Whistler, Ken; Constable, Peter (2021-04-26), "Consensus 167-C12", UTC #167 properties feedback & recommendations, "For Unicode version 14.0, reassign six code points U+1AC9..1ACE as noted in L2/21-069 item PRI428a." |
| 14.0 | U+1AC5, 1AC7..1ACA | 5 | L2/21-066 | | Moore, Lisa (2021-05-05), "Consensus 167-C12", UTC #167 Minutes, "For Unicode version 14.0, reassign six code points U+1AC9..1ACE as noted in L2/21-069 item PRI428a." |
| 14.0 | U+1AC6 | 1 | L2/20-182 | | Miller, Kirk; Henry-Rodriguez, Timothy (2020-07-11), Unicode request for Harrington diacritic |
| 14.0 | U+1AC6 | 1 | L2/20-169 | | Anderson, Deborah; Whistler, Ken; Pournader, Roozbeh; Moore, Lisa; Constable, Peter; Liang, Hai (2020-07-21), "3e. Harrington diacritic", Recommendations to UTC #164 July 2020 on Script Proposals |
| 14.0 | U+1AC6 | 1 | L2/20-172 | | Moore, Lisa (2020-08-03), "Consensus 164-C12", UTC #164 Minutes |
| 14.0 | U+1ACB..1ACE | 4 | L2/19-178 | N5043 | Everson, Michael; West, Andrew (2019-06-10), Proposal to add ten characters for Middle English |
| 14.0 | U+1ACB..1ACE | 4 | L2/20-268 | N5145 | Everson, Michael; West, Andrew (2020-10-05), Revised proposal to add ten characters for Middle English to the UCS |
| 14.0 | U+1ACB..1ACE | 4 | L2/21-016R | | Anderson, Deborah; Whistler, Ken; Pournader, Roozbeh; Moore, Lisa; Liang, Hai (2021-01-14), "3l. Ten Characters for Middle English (Ormulum)", Recommendations to UTC #166 January 2021 on Script Proposals |
| 14.0 | U+1ACB..1ACE | 4 | L2/21-009 | | Moore, Lisa (2021-01-27), "B.1 — 3l. Ten Characters for Middle English (Ormulum)", UTC #166 Minutes |
| 14.0 | U+1ACB..1ACE | 4 | L2/21-069R | | Scherer, Markus; Davis, Mark; Freytag, Asmus; Chapman, Christopher; Whistler, Ken; Constable, Peter (2021-04-26), "PRI428a: Diacritical Marks Extended: Rotate code points U+1AC9..1ACE", UTC #167 properties feedback & recommendations |
| 14.0 | U+1ACB..1ACE | 4 | L2/21-066 | | Moore, Lisa (2021-05-05), "Consensus 167-C12", UTC #167 Minutes, "For Unicode version 14.0, reassign six code points U+1AC9..1ACE as noted in L2/21-069 item PRI428a." |
| 17.0 | U+1ACF | 1 | L2/23-189 | | Miller, Kirk (2023-07-17), Unicode request for IPA compound tone diacritic |
| 17.0 | U+1ACF | 1 | L2/23-164 | | Anderson, Deborah; Kučera, Jan; Whistler, Ken; Pournader, Roozbeh; Constable, Peter (2023-07-21), "18 Combining mark", Recommendations to UTC #176 July 2023 on Script Proposals |
| 17.0 | U+1ACF | 1 | L2/24-105 | | Miller, Kirk (2024-04-15), Unicode request for double caron |
| 17.0 | U+1ACF | 1 | L2/24-068 | | Anderson, Deborah; Goregaokar, Manish; Kučera, Jan; Whistler, Ken; Pournader, Roozbeh; Constable, Peter (2024-04-18), "13. Combining Double Caron", Recommendations to UTC #179 April 2024 on Script Proposals |
| 17.0 | U+1ACF | 1 | L2/24-061 | | Constable, Peter (2024-04-29), "13. Combining Double Caron", UTC #179 Minutes |
| 17.0 | U+1AD0..1AD5 | 6 | L2/23-188 | | Miller, Kirk (2023-07-26), Unicode request for compound tone diacritics |
| 17.0 | U+1AD0..1AD5 | 6 | L2/23-164 | | Anderson, Deborah; Kučera, Jan; Whistler, Ken; Pournader, Roozbeh; Constable, Peter (2023-07-21), "7 Compound Tone Diacritics", Recommendations to UTC #176 July 2023 on Script Proposals |
| 17.0 | U+1AD6..1AD8 | 3 | L2/23-208 | | Miller, Kirk (2023-09-18), Unicode request for compound tone diacritics II |
| 17.0 | U+1AD6..1AD8 | 3 | L2/23-238R | | Anderson, Deborah; Kučera, Jan; Whistler, Ken; Pournader, Roozbeh; Constable, Peter (2023-11-01), "9 Compound Tone Diacritics II", Recommendations to UTC #177 November 2023 on Script Proposals |
| 17.0 | U+1AD6..1AD8 | 3 | L2/23-231 | | Constable, Peter (2023-12-08), "Consensus 177-C38", UTC #177 Minutes |
| 17.0 | U+1AD9..1ADD | 5 | L2/23-206R | | Meroz, Yoram; Miller, Kirk; Vestuto, Matthew (2023-09-20), Unicode request for Harrington diacritics |
| 17.0 | U+1AD9..1ADD | 5 | L2/23-238R | | Anderson, Deborah; Kučera, Jan; Whistler, Ken; Pournader, Roozbeh; Constable, Peter (2023-11-01), "10 Harrington Diacritics", Recommendations to UTC #177 November 2023 on Script Proposals |
| 17.0 | U+1AD9..1ADD | 5 | L2/23-231 | | Constable, Peter (2023-12-08), "Consensus 177-C39", UTC #177 Minutes |
| 17.0 | U+1AD9..1ADD | 5 | L2/24-061 | | Constable, Peter (2024-04-29), "Consensus 179-C62", UTC #179 Minutes, "Approve the name change for provisionally assigned character U+1ADC COMBINING FALLING DIAGONAL DIAERESIS to COMBINING DIAERESIS WITH RAISED LEFT DOT" |
| 17.0 | U+1AE0..1AEB | 12 | L2/24-080 | | Miller, Kirk (2024-04-01), Unicode request for IPA diacritics above and one below |
| 17.0 | U+1AE0..1AEB | 12 | L2/24-068 | | Anderson, Deborah; Goregaokar, Manish; Kučera, Jan; Whistler, Ken; Pournader, Roozbeh; Constable, Peter (2024-04-18), "14. IPA diacritics above and one below", Recommendations to UTC #179 April 2024 on Script Proposals |
| 17.0 | U+1AE0..1AEB | 12 | L2/24-061 | | Constable, Peter (2024-04-29), "Consensus 179-C58", UTC #179 Minutes, "Provisionally assign 12 combining diacritical marks" |
| 17.0 | U+1AE0..1AEB | 12 | L2/24-221 | | Constable, Peter (2024-11-12), "D.1 6.6 Name of IPA diacritic COMBINING LEFT ANGLE CENTERED ABOVE", UTC #181 Minutes |
| 18.0 | U+1ADE..1ADF, 1AEC..1AF0 | 7 | L2/24-232 | | Miller, Kirk (2024-10-18), Unicode request for compound tone diacritics III |
| 18.0 | U+1ADE..1ADF, 1AEC..1AF0 | 7 | L2/24-228 | | Kučera, Jan; et al. (2024-11-01), "2.7 Phonetic", Recommendations to UTC #181 (November 2024) on Script Proposals |
| 18.0 | U+1ADE..1ADF, 1AEC..1AF0 | 7 | L2/24-221 | | Constable, Peter (2024-11-12), "Consensus 181-C34", UTC #181 Minutes, "Provisionally assign 7 code points ..." |
| 18.0 | U+1ADE..1ADF, 1AEC..1AF0 | 7 | L2/25-226 | | "Consensus 185-C40", UTC #185 Minutes, 2025-10-29, "UTC accepts for encoding in Unicode 18.0 ..." |
