= Germanic languages =

Branch of the Indo-European language family

Germanic
- Geographic distribution: Worldwide, principally Europe (Central, Northern and Western Europe), Africa (East and Southern Africa), the Americas (Anglo-America, the Dutch Caribbean, and Suriname), Asia (South and Southeast Asia) and Oceania
- Native speakers: c. 515 million
- Linguistic classification: Indo-European: Germanic
- Proto-language: Proto-Germanic
- Subdivisions: North Germanic; West Germanic; East Germanic †

Language codes
- ISO 639-2 / 5: gem
- Glottolog: germ1287
- Linguasphere: 52-
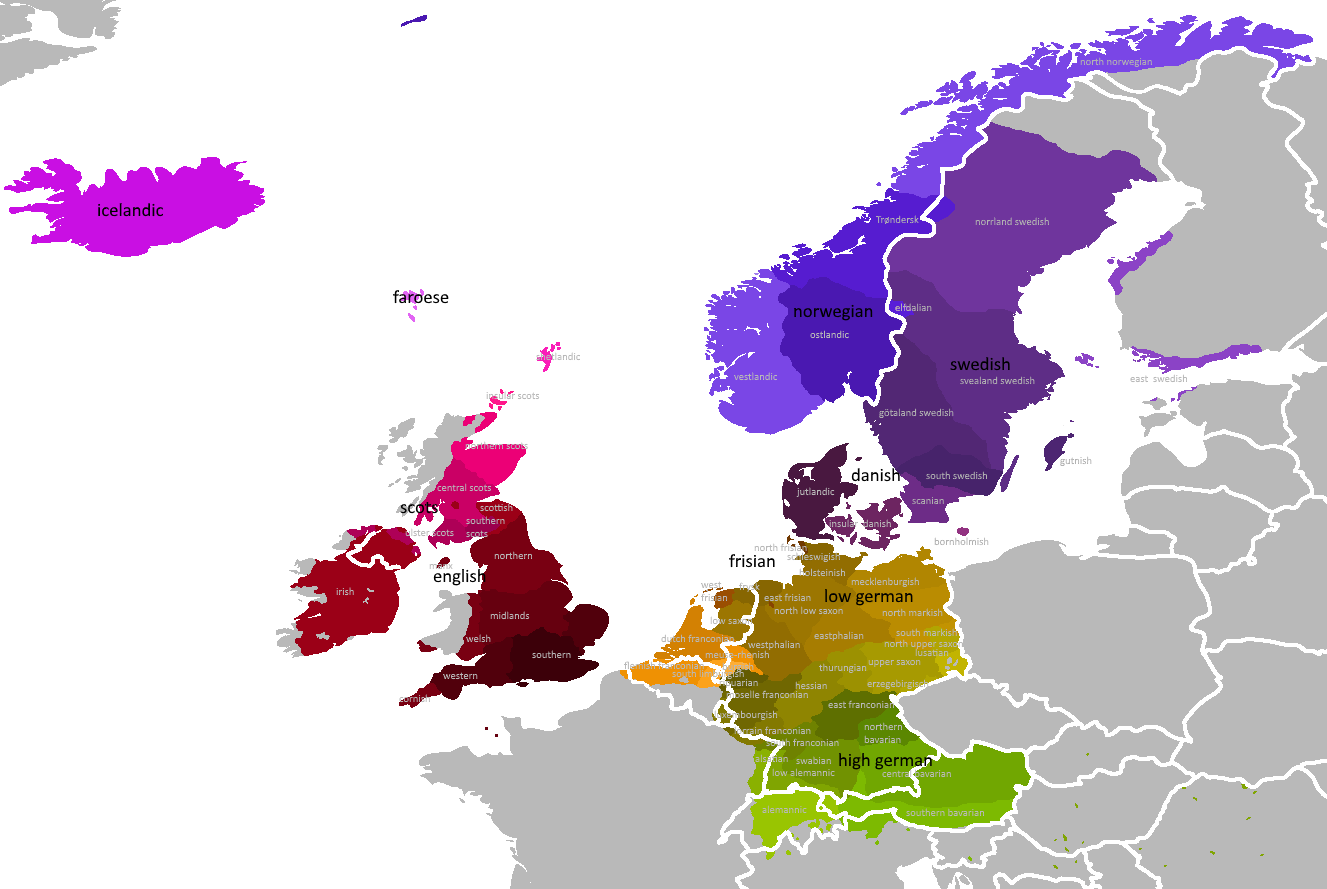
- Germanic languages in Europe

- Germanic languages globally Majority native language Official but not majority native language Used widely in an unofficial capacity

The Germanic languages are a branch of the Indo-European language family spoken natively by a population of about 515 million people (Note: Estimates of native speakers of the Germanic languages vary from 450 million through 500 million and up to more than 520 million. Much of the uncertainty is caused by the rapid spread of the English language and conflicting estimates of its native speakers. Here used is the most probable estimate (currently 515 million) as determined by Statistics section below.) mainly in Europe, Northern America, Oceania, and Southern Africa. The most widely spoken Germanic language, English, is also the world's most widely spoken language with an estimated 2 billion speakers. All Germanic languages are derived from Proto-Germanic, spoken in Iron Age Scandinavia, Iron Age Northern Germany and along the North Sea and Baltic coasts.

The West Germanic languages include the three most widely spoken Germanic languages: English with around 360–400 million native speakers; (Note: There are various conflicting estimates of L1/native users of English, from 360 million up to 430 million and more. English is a current lingua franca, which is spreading rapidly, often replacing other languages throughout the world, thus making it difficult to provide one definitive number. It is a rare case of a language with many more secondary speakers than natives.) German, with over 100 million native speakers; and Dutch, with 24 million native speakers. Other West Germanic languages include Afrikaans, an offshoot of Dutch originating from the Afrikaners of South Africa, with over 7.1 million native speakers; Low German, considered a separate collection of unstandardized dialects, with roughly 4.35–7.15 million native speakers and probably 6.7–10 million people who can understand it (at least 2.2 million in Germany (2016) and 2.15 million in the Netherlands (2003)); Yiddish, once used by approximately 13 million Jews in pre-World War II Europe, now with approximately 1.5 million native speakers; Scots, with 1.5 million native speakers; Limburgish varieties with roughly 1.3 million speakers along the Dutch–Belgian–German border; and the Frisian languages with over 500,000 native speakers in the Netherlands and Germany.

The largest North Germanic languages are Swedish, Danish, and Norwegian, which are in part mutually intelligible and have a combined total of about 20 million native speakers in the Nordic countries and an additional five million second language speakers; since the Middle Ages, however, these languages have been strongly influenced by Middle Low German, a West Germanic language, and Low German words account for about 30–60% of their vocabularies according to various estimates. Other extant North Germanic languages are Faroese, Icelandic, and Elfdalian, which are more conservative languages with no significant Low German influence, more complex grammar and limited mutual intelligibility with other North Germanic languages today.

The East Germanic branch included Gothic, Burgundian and Vandalic. The last to die off was Crimean Gothic, spoken until the late 18th century in some isolated areas of Crimea.

The SIL Ethnologue lists 48 different living Germanic languages, 41 of which belong to the Western branch and six to the Northern branch; it places Riograndenser Hunsrückisch German in neither of the categories, but it is often considered a German dialect by linguists. The common ancestor of all of the languages in this branch is called Proto-Germanic, also known as Common Germanic, which was spoken in about the middle of the 1st millennium BC in Iron Age Scandinavia and Iron Age Northern Germany. Proto-Germanic, along with all of its descendants, notably has a number of unique linguistic features, most famously the consonant change known as "Grimm's law." Early varieties of Germanic entered history when the Germanic tribes moved south from Scandinavia and northern Germany in the 2nd century BC to settle in the area of today's western Germany and along the Baltic coasts.

== Modern status ==
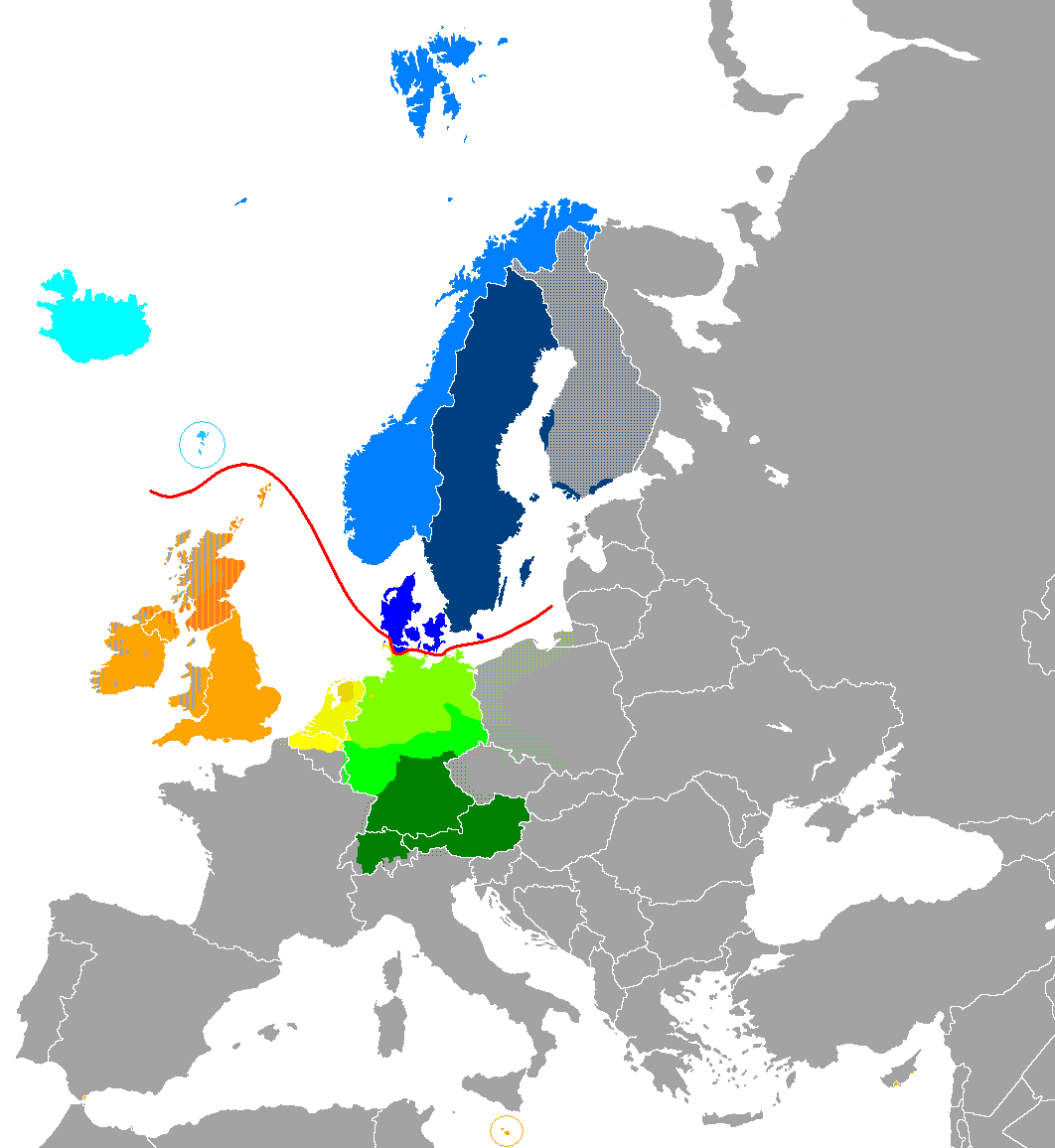
Extent of Germanic languages in present-day Europe: North Germanic languages; Icelandic; Faroese; Norwegian; Swedish; Danish; West Germanic languages; Scots; English; Frisian; Dutch; Flemish; Low German; Central German (High German); Upper German (High German); Dots indicate areas where it is common for L1 non-Germanic speakers to be L2 speakers of a neighbouring Germanic language.; Lines indicate areas where it is common for L1 Germanic speakers to be L2 speakers of a neighbouring non-Germanic or other Germanic language.

=== West Germanic languages ===
English is an official language of Belize, Canada, Nigeria, Falkland Islands, Saint Helena, Malta, Ireland, South Africa, Philippines, Jamaica, Dominica, Guyana, Trinidad and Tobago, American Samoa, Palau, St. Lucia, Grenada, Barbados, St. Vincent and the Grenadines, Puerto Rico, Guam, Hong Kong, Singapore, Pakistan, India, Papua New Guinea, Namibia, Vanuatu, the Solomon Islands and former British colonies in Asia, Africa and Oceania. Furthermore, it is the de facto language of the United Kingdom, the United States, New Zealand and Australia, as well as a recognized language in Nicaragua and Malaysia.

German is a language of Austria, Belgium, Germany, Liechtenstein, Luxembourg and Switzerland; it also has regional status in Italy, Poland, Namibia and Denmark. German also continues to be spoken as a minority language by immigrant communities in North America, South America, Central America, Mexico and Australia. A German dialect, Pennsylvania Dutch, is still used among various populations in the American state of Pennsylvania in daily life. A group of Alemannic German dialects commonly referred to as Alsatian is spoken in Alsace, part of modern France.

Dutch is an official language of Aruba, Belgium, Curaçao, the Netherlands, Sint Maarten, and Suriname. The Netherlands also colonized Indonesia, but Dutch was scrapped as an official language after Indonesian independence. Today, it is only used by older or traditionally educated people. Dutch was until 1983 an official language in South Africa but evolved into and was replaced by Afrikaans, a partially mutually intelligible daughter language of Dutch.

Afrikaans is one of the 12 official languages in South Africa and is a lingua franca of Namibia. It is used in other Southern African nations, as well.

Low German is a collection of very diverse dialects spoken in the northeast of the Netherlands and northern Germany. Some dialects like East Pomeranian have been imported to South America.

Scots is one of the 3 official languages of Scotland and is spoken by over 1.5 million people, mostly in the Lowlands of Scotland but also in the Northern Isles (Orcadian, Shetlandic) and parts of Ulster (where the local dialect is known as Ulster Scots).

Frisian is spoken among half a million people who live on the southern fringes of the North Sea in the Netherlands and Germany.

Luxembourgish is a Moselle Franconian dialect that is spoken mainly in the Grand Duchy of Luxembourg, where it is an official language. Similar varieties of Moselle Franconian are spoken in small parts of Belgium, France, and Germany.

Yiddish, once a native language of some 11 to 13 million people, remains in use by some 1.5 million speakers in Jewish communities around the world, mainly in North America, Europe, Israel, and other regions with Jewish populations.

Limburgish varieties are spoken in the Limburg and Rhineland regions, along the Dutch–Belgian–German border.

=== North Germanic languages ===
In addition to being the official language in Sweden, Swedish is also spoken natively by the Swedish-speaking minority in Finland, which is a large part of the population along the coast of western and southern Finland. Swedish is also one of the two official languages in Finland, along with Finnish, and the only official language in Åland. Swedish is also spoken by some people in Estonia.

Danish is an official language of Denmark and in its overseas territory of the Faroe Islands, and it is a lingua franca and language of education in its other overseas territory of Greenland, where it was one of the official languages until 2009. Danish, a locally recognized minority language, is also natively spoken by the Danish minority in the German state of Schleswig-Holstein. Danish was an official language of Iceland when it was a territory ruled by Denmark–Norway; though its official status was terminated in 1944, it is still widely used and is a mandatory subject in school, taught as a second foreign language after English.

Norwegian is the official language of Norway (both Bokmål and Nynorsk). Norwegian is also the official language in the overseas territories of Norway such as Svalbard, Jan Mayen, Bouvet Island, Queen Maud Land, and Peter I island.

Icelandic is the official language of Iceland.

Faroese is the official language of the Faroe Islands, and is also spoken by some people in Denmark.

=== Statistics ===
Germanic languages by share (West Germanic in yellow-red shades and North Germanic in blue shades): (Note: It uses the lowest estimate for English (360 million).)
1. English (69.9%)
2. German (19.4%)
3. Dutch (4.50%)
4. Afrikaans (1.40%)
5. Other West Germanic (1.00%)
6. Swedish (1.80%)
7. Danish (1.10%)
8. Norwegian (1.00%)
9. Other North Germanic (0.10%)

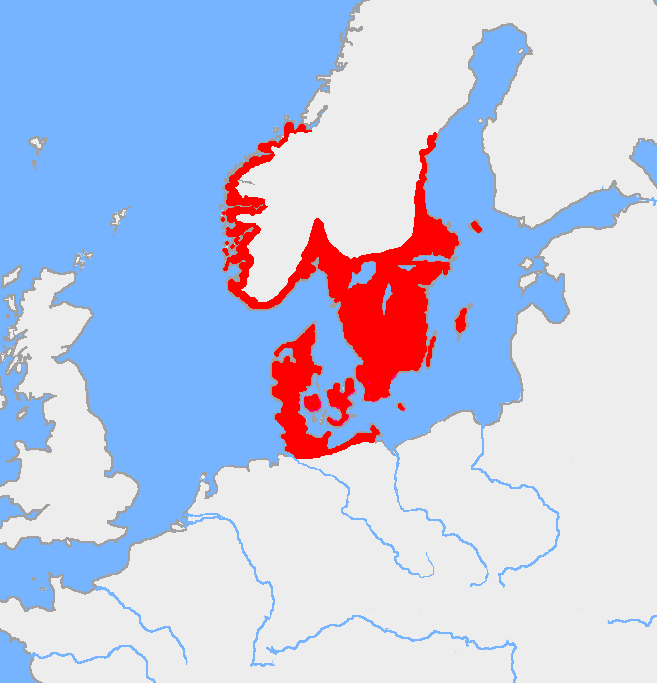
Area of the Nordic Bronze Age culture, ca 1200 BC

Germanic languages by number of native speakers
Language	Native speakers (millions) (Note: Estimates for English, German and Dutch are less precise than these for the rest of the Germanic languages. These three languages are the most widely spoken ones; the rest are largely concentrated in specific places (excluding Yiddish and Afrikaans), so precise estimates are easier to get.)
English	360–400
German	100 (Note: Estimate includes most High German dialects classified into the German language spectrum, while leaves some out like the Yiddish language. Low German is regarded separately.)
Dutch	24
Swedish	11.1
Afrikaans	8.1
Danish	5.5
Norwegian	5.3
Low German	3.8
Yiddish	1.5
Scots	1.5
Frisian languages	0.5
Luxembourgish	0.4
Icelandic	0.3
Faroese	0.07
Other Germanic languages	0.01 (Note: All other Germanic languages, including Gutnish, Dalecarlian dialects (among them Elfdalian) and any other minor languages.)
Total	est. 515 (Note: Estimates of native speakers of the Germanic languages vary from 450 million through 500 million and up to more than 520 million. Much of the uncertainty is caused by the rapid spread of the English language and conflicting estimates of its native speakers. Here used is the most probable estimate as determined by Statistics section.)

== History ==
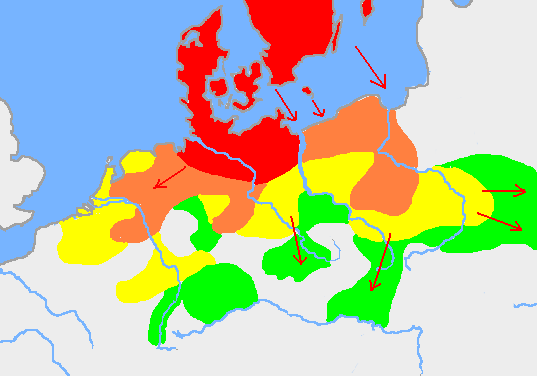
Expansion of early Germanic tribes into previously mostly Celtic Central Europe: Settlements before 750 BC New settlements by 500 BC New settlements by 250 BC New settlements by AD 1 Some sources also give a date of 750 BC for the earliest expansion out of southern Scandinavia and northern Germany along the North Sea coast towards the mouth of the Rhine.

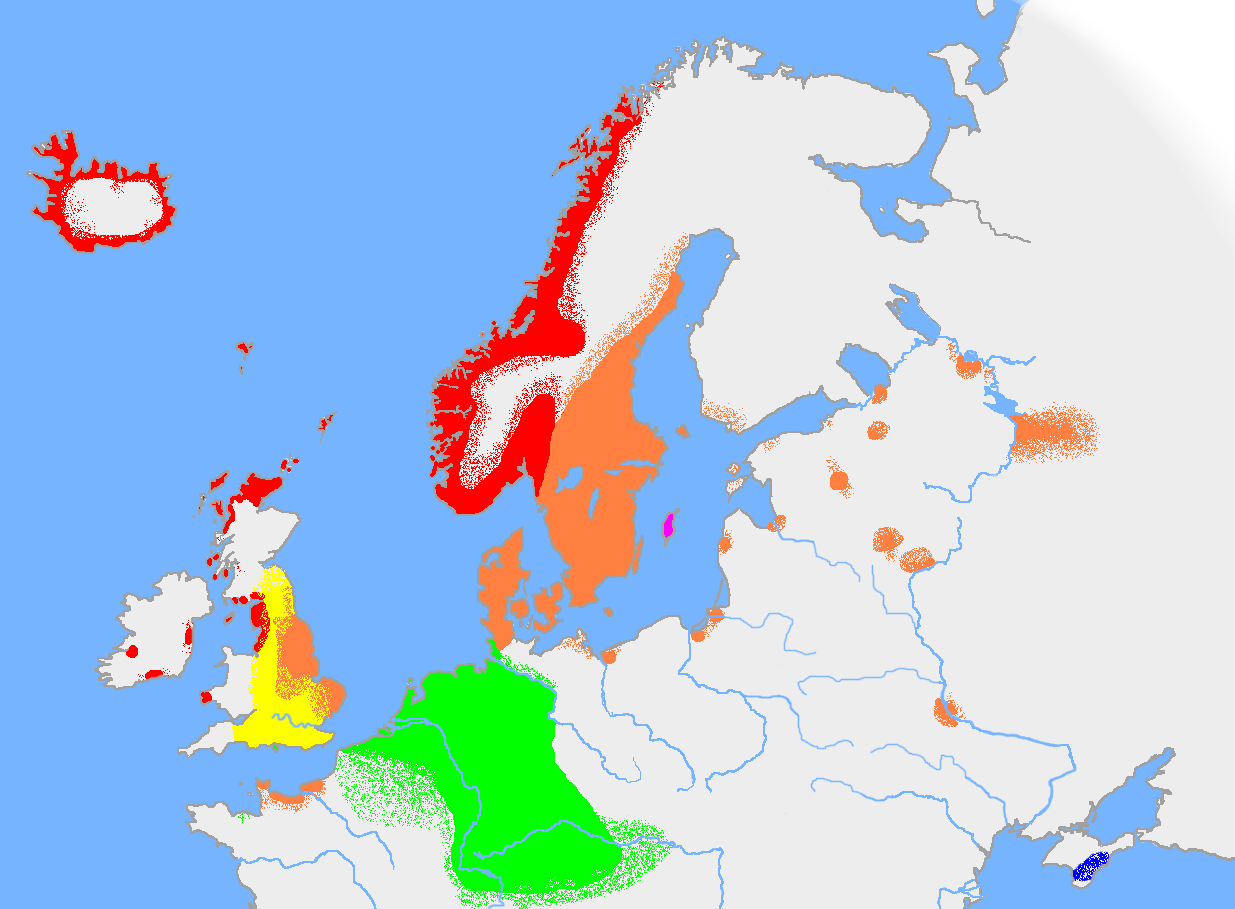
The approximate extent of Germanic languages in the early 10th century: Old West Norse Old East Norse Old Gutnish Old English (West Germanic) Continental West Germanic languages (Old Frisian, Old Saxon, Old Dutch, Old High German). Crimean Gothic (East Germanic)

All Germanic languages are thought to be descended from a hypothetical Proto-Germanic, united by subjection to the sound shifts of Grimm's law and Verner's law. These probably took place during the Pre-Roman Iron Age of Northern Europe c. 500 BC. Proto-Germanic itself was likely spoken after c. 500 BC, and Proto-Norse from the 2nd century AD and later is still quite close to reconstructed Proto-Germanic, but other common innovations separating Germanic from Proto-Indo-European suggest a common history of pre-Proto-Germanic speakers throughout the Nordic Bronze Age.

From the time of their earliest attestation, the Germanic varieties are divided into three groups: West, East, and North Germanic. Their exact relation is difficult to determine from the sparse evidence of runic inscriptions.

The western group would have formed in the late Jastorf culture, and the eastern group may be derived from the 1st-century variety of Gotland, leaving southern Sweden as the original location of the northern group. The earliest period of Elder Futhark (2nd to 4th centuries) predates the division in regional script variants, and linguistically essentially still reflects the Common Germanic stage. The Vimose inscriptions include some of the oldest datable Germanic inscriptions, starting in c. 160 AD.

The earliest coherent Germanic text preserved is the 4th-century Gothic translation of the New Testament by Ulfilas. Early testimonies of West Germanic are in Old Frankish/Old Dutch (the 5th-century Bergakker inscription), Old High German (scattered words and sentences 6th century and coherent texts 9th century), and Old English (oldest texts 650, coherent texts 10th century). North Germanic is only attested in scattered runic inscriptions, as Proto-Norse, until it evolves into Old Norse by about 800.

Longer runic inscriptions survive from the 8th and 9th centuries (Eggjum stone, Rök stone), longer texts in the Latin alphabet survive from the 12th century (Íslendingabók), and some skaldic poetry dates back to as early as the 9th century.

By about the 10th century, the varieties had diverged enough to make mutual intelligibility difficult. The linguistic contact of the Viking settlers of the Danelaw with the Anglo-Saxons left traces in the English language and is suspected to have facilitated the collapse of Old English grammar that, combined with the influx of Romance Old French vocabulary after the Norman Conquest, resulted in Middle English from the 12th century.

The East Germanic languages were marginalized from the end of the Migration Period. The Burgundians, Goths, and Vandals became linguistically assimilated by their respective neighbors by about the 7th century, with only Crimean Gothic lingering on until the 18th century.

During the early Middle Ages, the West Germanic languages were separated by the insular development of Middle English on one hand and by the High German consonant shift on the continent on the other, resulting in Upper German and Low Saxon, with graded intermediate Central German varieties. By early modern times, the span had extended into considerable differences, ranging from Highest Alemannic in the South to Northern Low Saxon in the North, and, although both extremes are considered German, they are hardly mutually intelligible. The southernmost varieties had completed the second sound shift, while the northern varieties remained unaffected by the consonant shift.

The North Germanic languages, on the other hand, remained unified until well past 1000 AD, and in fact the mainland Scandinavian languages still largely retain mutual intelligibility into modern times. The main split in these languages is between the mainland languages and the island languages to the west, especially Icelandic, which has maintained the grammar of Old Norse virtually unchanged, while the mainland languages have diverged greatly.

== Distinctive characteristics ==
Germanic languages possess a number of defining features compared with other Indo-European languages.

Some of the best-known are the following:

1. The sound changes known as Grimm's law and Verner's law, which shifted the values of all the Indo-European stop consonants (for example, original */t d dʰ/ became Germanic */θ t d/ in most cases; compare three with Latin tres, two with Latin duo, do with Sanskrit dhā-). The recognition of these two sound laws were seminal events in the understanding of the regular nature of linguistic sound change and the development of the comparative method, which forms the basis of modern historical linguistics.
2. The development of a strong stress on the first syllable of the word, which triggered significant phonological reduction of all other syllables. This is responsible for the reduction of most of the basic English, Norwegian, Danish and Swedish words into monosyllables, and the common impression of modern English and German as consonant-heavy languages. Examples are Proto-Germanic *strangiþō → strength, *aimaitijō → ant, *haubudą → head, *hauzijaną → hear, *harubistaz → German Herbst "autumn, harvest", *hagatusjō → German Hexe "witch, hag".
3. A change known as Germanic umlaut, which modified vowel qualities when a high front vocalic segment (/i/, /iː/ or /j/) followed in the next syllable. Generally, back vowels were fronted, and front vowels were raised. In many languages, the modified vowels are indicated with an umlaut mark (e.g., ä ö ü in German, pronounced /ɛ(ː) œ ~ øː ʏ ~ yː/, respectively). This change resulted in pervasive alternations in related words — prominent in modern German and present to a lesser extent in modern English (e.g., mouse/mice, goose/geese, broad/breadth, tell/told, old/elder, foul/filth, gold/gild).
4. Large numbers of vowel qualities. English has around 11–12 vowels in most dialects (not counting diphthongs), Standard Swedish has 17 pure vowels (monophthongs), standard German and Dutch 14, and Danish at least 11. The Amstetten dialect of Bavarian German has 13 distinctions among long vowels alone, one of the largest such inventories in the world.
5. Verb second (V2) word order, which is uncommon cross-linguistically. Exactly one noun phrase or adverbial element must precede the verb; in particular, if an adverb or prepositional phrase precedes the verb, then the subject must immediately follow the finite verb. In modern English, this survives to a lesser extent, known as "inversion": examples include some constructions with here or there (Here comes the sun; there are five continents), verbs of speech after a quote ("Yes", said John), sentences beginning with certain conjunctions (Hardly had he said this when...; Only much later did he realize...) and sentences beginning with certain adverbs of motion to create a sense of drama (Over went the boat; out ran the cat; Pop Goes The Weasel). It is more common in other modern Germanic languages.

Other significant characteristics are:

1. The reduction of the various tense and aspect combinations of the Indo-European verbal system into only two: the present tense and the past tense (also called the preterite).
2. The development of a new class of weak verbs that use a dental suffix (/d/, /t/ or /ð/) instead of vowel alternation (Indo-European ablaut) to indicate past tense. The vast majority of verbs in all Germanic languages are weak; the remaining verbs with vowel ablaut are the strong verbs. The distinction has been lost in Afrikaans, except in fossilised forms such as the strong past participle "gedaan".
3. A distinction in definiteness of a noun phrase that is marked by different sets of inflectional endings for adjectives, the so-called strong and weak inflections. A similar development happened in the Balto-Slavic languages. This distinction has been lost in modern English but was present in Old English and remains in all other Germanic languages to various degrees.
4. Some words with etymologies that are difficult to link to other Indo-European families but with variants that appear in almost all Germanic languages. See Germanic substrate hypothesis.
5. Discourse particles, which are a class of short, unstressed words which speakers use to express their attitude towards the utterance or the hearer. This word category seems to be rare outside of the Germanic languages. An example would be the word 'just', which the speaker can use to express surprise.

Some of the characteristics present in Germanic languages were not present in Proto-Germanic but developed later as areal features that spread from language to language:

- Germanic umlaut only affected the North and West Germanic languages (which represent all modern Germanic languages) but not the now-extinct East Germanic languages, such as Gothic, nor Proto-Germanic, the common ancestor of all Germanic languages.
- The large inventory of vowel qualities is a later development, due to a combination of Germanic umlaut and the tendency in many Germanic languages for pairs of long/short vowels of originally identical quality to develop distinct qualities, with the length distinction sometimes eventually lost. Proto-Germanic had only five distinct vowel qualities, although there were more actual vowel phonemes because length and possibly nasality were phonemic. In modern German, long-short vowel pairs still exist but are also distinct in quality.
- Proto-Germanic probably had a more general S-O-V-I word order. However, the tendency toward V2 order may have already been present in latent form and may be related to Wackernagel's law, an Indo-European law dictating that sentence clitics must be placed second.

Roughly speaking, Germanic languages differ in how conservative or how progressive each language is with respect to an overall trend toward analyticity. Some, such as Icelandic and, to a lesser extent, German, have preserved much of the complex inflectional morphology inherited from Proto-Germanic (and in turn from Proto-Indo-European). Others, such as English, Swedish, and Afrikaans, have moved toward a largely analytic type.

== Linguistic developments ==
The subgroupings of the Germanic languages are defined by shared innovations. It is important to distinguish innovations from cases of linguistic conservatism. That is, if two languages in a family share a characteristic that is not observed in a third language, that is evidence of common ancestry of the two languages only if the characteristic is an innovation compared to the family's proto-language.

The following innovations are common to the Northwest Germanic languages (all but Gothic):

- The lowering of /u/ to /o/ in initial syllables before /a/ in the following syllable: *budą → bode, Icelandic boðs "messages" ("a-Umlaut", traditionally called Brechung)
- "Labial umlaut" in unstressed medial syllables (the conversion of /a/ to /u/ and /ō/ to /ū/ before /m/, or /u/ in the following syllable)
- The conversion of /ē_{1}/ into /ā/ (vs. Gothic /ē/) in stressed syllables. In unstressed syllables, West Germanic also has this change, but North Germanic has shortened the vowel to /e/, then raised it to /i/. This suggests it was an areal change.
- The raising of final /ō/ to /u/ (Gothic lowers it to /a/). It is kept distinct from the nasal /ǭ/, which is not raised.
- The monophthongization of /ai/ and /au/ to /ē/ and /ō/ in non-initial syllables (however, evidence for the development of /au/ in medial syllables is lacking).
- The development of an intensified demonstrative ending in /s/ (reflected in English "this" compared to "the")
- Introduction of a distinct ablaut grade in Class VII strong verbs, while Gothic uses reduplication (e.g. Gothic haihait; ON, OE hēt, preterite of the Gmc verb *haitan "to be called") as part of a comprehensive reformation of the Gmc Class VII from a reduplicating to a new ablaut pattern, which presumably started in verbs beginning with vowel or /h/ (a development which continues the general trend of de-reduplication in Gmc); there are forms (such as OE dial. heht instead of hēt) which retain traces of reduplication even in West and North Germanic

The following innovations are also common to the Northwest Germanic languages but represent areal changes:

- Proto-Germanic /z/ > /r/ (e.g. Gothic dius; ON dȳr, OHG tior, OE dēor, "wild animal"); note that this is not present in Proto-Norse and must be ordered after West Germanic loss of final /z/
- Germanic umlaut

The following innovations are common to the West Germanic languages:

- Loss of final /z/. In single-syllable words, Old High German retains it (as /r/), while it disappears in the other West Germanic languages.
- Change of [ð] (fricative allophone of /d/) to stop [d] in all environments.
- Change of /lþ/ to stop /ld/ (except word-finally).
- West Germanic gemination of consonants, except r, before /j/. This only occurred in short-stemmed words due to Sievers' law. Gemination of /p/, /t/, /k/ and /h/ is also observed before liquids.
- Labiovelar consonants become plain velar when non-initial.
- A particular type of umlaut /e-u-i/ > /i-u-i/.
- Changes to the 2nd person singular past-tense: Replacement of the past-singular stem vowel with the past-plural stem vowel, and substitution of the ending -t with -ī.
- Short forms (*stān, stēn, *gān, gēn) of the verbs for "stand" and "go"; but note that Crimean Gothic also has gēn.
- The development of a gerund.

The following innovations are common to the Ingvaeonic subgroup of the West Germanic languages, affecting mainly English, Frisian, and to a lesser extent Low German (all of which are Ingvaeonic), as well as Dutch, but not High German:

- The so-called Ingvaeonic nasal spirant law, with loss of /n/ before voiceless fricatives: e.g. *munþ, *gans > Old English mūþ, gōs > "mouth, goose", but German Mund, Gans.
- The loss of the Germanic reflexive pronoun *se-. Dutch has reclaimed the reflexive pronoun zich from Middle High German sich.
- The reduction of the three Germanic verbal plural forms into one form ending in -þ.
- The development of Class III weak verbs into a relic class consisting of four verbs (*sagjan "to say", *hugjan "to think", *habjan "to have", *libjan "to live"; cf. the numerous Old High German verbs in -ēn).
- The split of the Class II weak verb ending *-ō- into *-ō-/-ōja- (cf. Old English -ian < -ōjan, but Old High German -ōn).
- Development of a plural ending *-ōs in a-stem nouns (note, Gothic also has -ōs, but this is an independent development, caused by terminal devoicing of *-ōz; Old Frisian has -ar, which is thought to be a late borrowing from Danish). Cf. modern English plural -(e)s, but German plural -e.
- Possibly, the monophthongization of Germanic *ai to ē/ā (this may represent independent changes in Old Saxon and Anglo-Frisian).

The following innovations are common to the Anglo-Frisian subgroup of the Ingvaeonic languages:

- Raising of nasalized a, ā into o, ō.
- Anglo-Frisian brightening: Fronting of non-nasal a, ā to æ,ǣ when not followed by n or m.
- Metathesis of CrV into CVr, where C represents any consonant and V any vowel.
- Monophthongization of ai into ā.

== Common linguistic features ==
=== Phonology ===
The oldest Germanic languages all share a number of features, which are assumed to be inherited from Proto-Germanic. Phonologically, it includes the important sound changes known as Grimm's law and Verner's law, which introduced a large number of fricatives; late Proto-Indo-European had only one, /s/.

The main vowel developments are the merging (in most circumstances) of long and short /a/ and /o/, producing short /a/ and long /ō/. That likewise affected the diphthongs, with PIE /ai/ and /oi/ merging into /ai/ and PIE /au/ and /ou/ merging into /au/. PIE /ei/ developed into long /ī/. PIE long /ē/ developed into a vowel denoted as /ē_{1}/ (often assumed to be phonetically [æː]), while a new, fairly uncommon long vowel /ē_{2}/ developed in varied and not completely understood circumstances. Proto-Germanic had no front rounded vowels, but all Germanic languages except for Gothic subsequently developed them through the process of i-umlaut.

Proto-Germanic developed a strong stress accent on the first syllable of the root, but remnants of the original free PIE accent are visible due to Verner's law, which was sensitive to this accent. That caused a steady erosion of vowels in unstressed syllables. In Proto-Germanic, that had progressed only to the point that absolutely-final short vowels (other than /i/ and /u/) were lost and absolutely-final long vowels were shortened, but all of the early literary languages show a more advanced state of vowel loss. This ultimately resulted in some languages (like Modern English) losing practically all vowels following the main stress and the consequent rise of a very large number of monosyllabic words.

==== Table of outcomes ====
The following table shows the main outcomes of Proto-Germanic vowels and consonants in the various older languages. For vowels, only the outcomes in stressed syllables are shown. Outcomes in unstressed syllables are quite different, vary from language to language and depend on a number of other factors (such as whether the syllable was medial or final, whether the syllable was open or closed and (in some cases) whether the preceding syllable was light or heavy).

Notes:

- C- means before a vowel (word-initially, or sometimes after a consonant).
- -C- means between vowels.
- -C means after a vowel (word-finally or before a consonant). Word-final outcomes generally occurred after deletion of final short vowels, which occurred shortly after Proto-Germanic and is reflected in the history of all written languages except for Proto-Norse.
- The above three are given in the order C-, -C-, -C. If one is omitted, the previous one applies. For example, f, -[v]- means that [v] occurs after a vowel regardless of what follows.
- Something like a(…u) means "a if /u/ occurs in the next syllable".
- Something like a(n) means "a if /n/ immediately follows".
- Something like (n)a means "a if /n/ immediately precedes".

Development of Germanic sounds
Proto-Germanic	(Pre-)Gothic (Note: The Gothic writing system uses the spelling ⟨ai⟩ to represent vowels that derive primarily from four different sources: 1. Proto-Germanic /ai/; 2. Proto-Germanic /eː/ and /æː/ before vowels; 3. Proto-Germanic /e/ and /i/ before /h/, /hʷ/ and /r/; 4. Greek /ɛ/.; The spelling ⟨au⟩ is similarly used to represent vowels primarily deriving from the following four sources: 1. Proto-Germanic /au/; 2. Proto-Germanic /oː/ and /uː/ before vowels; 3. Proto-Germanic /u/ before /h/, /hʷ/ and /r/; 4. Greek /ɔ/.; It is generally agreed that the outcome of case 2 was pronounced [ɛː/ɔː] in Gothic, distinct from the vowels written ⟨e⟩ and ⟨o⟩, which were pronounced [eː/oː]. Likewise, it is generally agreed that the outcomes of cases 3 and 4 were pronounced [ɛ] and [ɔ] in Gothic. However, there is some argument over whether the outcomes of case 1 were still pronounced as diphthongs [ai/au], as in Proto-Germanic, or had merged with case 2 as monophthongs [ɛː/ɔː]. There is some historical evidence (particularly from Latin spelling variations of Gaut- vs. Gōt-, used to represent the name of the Goths) that the Proto-Germanic diphthongs had changed into monophthongs shortly before (i.e., within a century of) the time of Wulfila, who designed the Gothic alphabet and wrote the Gothic Bible c. 360 AD. This accords with the fact that Wulfila used the same symbols ⟨ai/au⟩ to represent all the outcomes, despite the fact that the spellings ⟨aj/aw⟩ were available to unambiguously represent diphthongs (and, in fact, alternate with ⟨ai/au⟩ in a number of nominal and verbal paradigms). The use of the spelling ⟨ai⟩ to represent a monophthong [ɛ(ː)] was evidently in imitation of 4th century Greek, where ⟨ai⟩ likewise stood for [ɛː], and ⟨au⟩ was apparently created by analogy. Consistent with many sources, such as Bennett (1980), the phonology described here is that of "Pre-Gothic" (i.e., the phonology of Gothic just before the monophthongization of /ai/ and /au/).)	Old Norse	Old English	Old High German
a	a	a, ɔ(...u) (Note: In Old Norse, non-rounded vowels become rounded when a /u/ or /w/ follows in the next syllable, in a process known as u-umlaut. Some vowels were affected similarly, but only by a following /w/; this process is sometimes termed w-umlaut. These processes operated after i-umlaut. U-umlaut (by a following /u/ or /w/) caused /a/, /ja/ (broken /e/), /aː/, and /e/ to round to /ɔ/ (written ǫ), /jɔ/ (written jǫ), /ɔː/ (written ǫ́ and later unrounded again to /aː/), and /ø/, respectively. The vowels /i/ and /ai/ rounded to /y/ and /ey/, respectively, only before /w/. Short /a/ become /ø/ by a combination of i-umlaut and w-umlaut.)	æ, a(...a), (Note: A process known as a-mutation or a-umlaut caused short /u/ to lower to /o/ before a non-high vowel (usually /a/) in the following syllable. All languages except Gothic were affected, although there are various exceptions in all the languages. Two similar process later operated: In Old High German, /iu/ (from Proto-Germanic /eu/,/iu/) became /io/ before a non-high vowel in the next syllable.; In Old English, /æ/ (from Proto-Germanic /a/) became /a/ before /a/ in the next syllable.; All of these processes were blocked in an i-umlaut context (i.e. by a following /j/).) a/o(n), æ̆ă(h,rC,lC) (Note: The diphthongal results are due to Old English breaking. In general, front vowels break into diphthongs before some subset of h, w, rC, and lC, where C is a consonant. The diphthong /æa/ is written ea; /eo/ is written eo; /iu/ is written io; and /iy/ is written ie. All diphthongs umlaut to /iy/ ie. All diphthongs occur both long and short. Note that there is significant dispute about the actual pronunciation of io and (especially) ie. Their interpretation as /iu/ and /iy/, respectively, follows Lass (1994), Old English: A historical linguistic companion.)	a
a(...i) (Note: All languages except Gothic were affected by i-umlaut. This was the most significant of the various umlaut processes operating in the Germanic languages, and caused back vowels to become fronted, and front vowels to be raised, when /i/, /iː/ or /j/ followed in the next syllable. The term i-umlaut actually refers to two separate processes that both were triggered in the same environment. The earlier process raised /e/ and /eu/ to /i/ and /iu/, respectively, and may have operated still in Proto-Germanic (with its effects in Gothic obscured due to later changes). The later process affected all back vowels and some front vowels; it operated independently in the various languages, occurring at differing times with differing results. Old English was the earliest and most-affected language, with nearly all vowels affected. Old High German was the last language to be affected; the only written evidence of the process is with short /a/, which is umlauted to /e/. However, later evidence suggests that other back vowels were also affected, perhaps still sub-phonemically in Old High German times. These are indicated with a diaeresis or "umlaut" symbol (two dots) placed over the affected vowels.)	a	e, ø(...u)	e, æ, ĭy̆(h,rC,lC)	e, a(hs,ht,Cw)
ãː	aː	aː	oː	aː
ãː(...i)	aː	æː	eː	äː
æː	eː, ɛː(V)	aː	æː, æa(h)	aː
æː(...i)	eː, ɛː(V)	æː	æː	äː
e	i, ɛ(h,hʷ,r)	ja, (Note: Proto-Germanic /e/ usually became Old Norse /ja/ by a process known as vowel breaking.) jø(...u), (w,r,l)e, (w,r,l)ø(...u)	e, ĕŏ(h,w,rC)	e, i(...u)
e(...i)	i, ɛ(h,hʷ,r)	i, y(...w)	i	i
eː	eː, ɛː(V)	eː	eː	ie
i	i, ɛ(h,hʷ,r)	i, y(...w)	i, ĭŭ(h,w,rC)	i
iː	iː	iː	iː, iu(h)	iː
oː	oː, ɔː(V)	oː	oː	uo
oː(...i)	oː, ɔː(V)	øː	eː	üö
u	u, ɔ(h,hʷ,r)	u, o(...a)	u, o(...a)	u, o(...a)
u(...i)	u, ɔ(h,hʷ,r)	y	y	ü
uː	uː, ɔː(V)	uː	uː	uː
uː(...i)	uː, ɔː(V)	yː	yː	üː
ai	ai	ei, ey(...w), aː(h,r) (Note: Before Proto-Germanic /x/, /xʷ/ or /r/, but not before Proto-Germanic /z/ (which only merged with /r/ much later in North Germanic). Cf. Old Norse árr (masc.) "messenger" < PG *airuz, ár (fem.) "oar" < PG *airō, vs. eir (fem.) "honor" < PG *aizō, eir (neut.) "bronze" < PG *aizan. (All four become ār in Old English; in Gothic, they become, respectively, airus, (unattested), *aiza, *aiz.) Cf. Köbler, Gerhard. "Altenglisches Wörterbuch" (PDF). Archived (PDF) from the original on 18 April 2003.)	aː	ei, eː(r,h,w,#) (Note: Before /r/, /h/ (including when derived from Proto-Germanic /xʷ/) or /w/, or word-finally.)
ai(...i)	ai	ei, æː(h,r)	æː	ei, eː(r,h,w,#)
au	au	au, oː(h)	æa	ou, oː(h,T) (Note: Before /h/ (including when derived from Proto-Germanic /xʷ/) or before any dental consonant, i.e. /s/,/z/,/þ/,/t/,/d/,/r/,/l/,/n/.)
au(...i)	au	ey, øː(h)	iy	öü, öː(h,T)
eu	iu	juː, joː(T) (Note: Before any dental consonant, i.e. /s/,/z/,/þ/,/t/,/d/,/r/,/l/,/n/.)	eo	io, iu(...i/u)
eu(...i)	iu	yː	iy	io, iu(...i/u)
p	p	p	p	pf-, -ff-, -f
t	t	t	t	ts-, -ss-, -s (Note: The result of the High German consonant shift produced a different sort of s than the original Proto-Germanic s. The former was written ⟨z⟩ and the latter ⟨s⟩. It is thought that the former was a dental /s/, somewhat like in English, while the latter was an "apicoalveolar" sound as in modern European Spanish, sounding somewhere between English /s/ and /ʃ/.Joos (1952)) Modern standard German has /ʃ/ for this sound in some contexts, e.g. initially before a consonant (schlimm cf. English slim; Stand /ʃtant/, cf. English stand), and after /r/ (Arsch, cf. English arse or ass). A number of modern southern German dialects have /ʃ/ for this sound before all consonants, whether or not word-initially.)
k	k	k	k, tʃ(i,e,æ)-, -k-, -(i)tʃ-, -tʃ(i)- (Note: Old English palatalizes /k,g,ɣ/ to /tʃ,dʒ,j/ near a front vowel. The sounds /k/ and /ɣ/ palatalized initially before any front vowel. Elsewhere /ɣ/ palatalized before /j/ or before or after any front vowel, where /k/ and /g/ (which occurred only in the combinations /gg/, /ng/) palatalized before /j/, or either before or after /i,iː/.)	k-, -xx-, -x
kʷ	kʷ	kv, -k	kw-, -k-, -(i)tʃ-, -tʃ(i)-	kw-, -xx-, -x
b-, -[β]- (Note: Voiced fricatives were originally allophones of voiced stops, when occurring after a vowel or after certain consonants (and for /g/, also initially — hard [g] occurred only in the combinations /gg/, /ng/). In Old Norse and Old English, voiceless fricatives became voiced between vowels (and finally after a vowel in Old Norse); as a result, voiced fricatives were reanalyzed as allophones of voiceless fricatives. In Old High German, all voiced fricatives hardened into stops.)	b-, -[β]-, -f	b-, -[v]-	b-, -[v]-, -f	b
d-, -[ð]-	d-, -[ð]-, -þ	d-, -[ð]-	d	t
[ɣ]-, -[ɣ]-	g-, -[ɣ]-, -[x]	g-, -[ɣ]-	g-, j(æ,e,i)-, -[ɣ]-, -j(æ,e,i)-, -(æ,e,i)j-	g
f	f	f, -[v]-	f, -[v]-, -f	f, p
þ	þ	þ, -[ð]-	þ, -[ð]-, -þ	d
x	h	h, -∅-	h, -∅-, -h	h
xʷ	hʷ	xv, -∅-	hw, -∅-, -h	hw, -h-
s	s	s-, -[z]-	s-, -[z]-, -s	ṣ-, -[ẓ]-, -ṣ
z	-z-, -s	r	-r-, -∅	-r-, -∅
r (Note: In the early periods of the various languages, the sound written /r/ may have been strongly velarized, as in modern American English (Lass 1994); this is one possible explanation for the various processes were triggered by h (probably [x]) and r.)	r	r	r	r
l	l	l	l	l
n	n	n-, -∅(s,p,t,k), (Note: Old English and Old Norse lose /n/ before certain consonants, with the previous vowel lengthened (in Old Norse, the following consonant is also lengthened).) -∅ (Note: /n/ lost finally and before /s,p,t,k/, but not before other consonants.)	n, -∅(f,s,þ)	n
m	m	m	m	m
j (Note: Proto-Germanic /j/ and /w/ were often lost between vowels in all languages, often with /j/ or /w/ later reappearing to break the hiatus, and not always corresponding to the sound previously present. After a consonant, Gothic consistently preserved /j/ and /w/, but most languages deleted /j/ (after triggering i-umlaut), and /w/ sometimes disappeared. The loss of /j/ after a consonant occurred in the various languages at different times and to differing degrees. For example, /j/ was still present in most circumstances in written Old Saxon, and was still present in Old Norse when a short vowel preceded and a back vowel followed; but in Old English and Old High German, /j/ only remained after an /r/ preceded by a short vowel.)	j	∅-, -j-, -∅	j	j
w	w	∅-, v-(a,e,i), -v-, -∅	w	w

=== Morphology ===
The oldest Germanic languages have the typical complex inflected morphology of old Indo-European languages, with four or five noun cases; verbs marked for person, number, tense and mood; multiple noun and verb classes; few or no articles; and rather free word order. The old Germanic languages are famous for having only two tenses (present and past), with three PIE past-tense aspects (imperfect, aorist, and perfect/stative) merged into one and no new tenses (future, pluperfect, etc.) developing. There were three moods: indicative, subjunctive (developed from the PIE optative mood) and imperative. Gothic verbs had a number of archaic features inherited from PIE that were lost in the other Germanic languages with few traces, including dual endings, an inflected passive voice (derived from the PIE mediopassive voice), and a class of verbs with reduplication in the past tense (derived from the PIE perfect). The complex tense system of modern English (e.g. In three months, the house will still be being built or If you had not acted so stupidly, we would never have been caught) is almost entirely due to subsequent developments (although paralleled in many of the other Germanic languages).

Among the primary innovations in Proto-Germanic are the preterite present verbs, a special set of verbs whose present tense looks like the past tense of other verbs and which is the origin of most modal verbs in English; a past-tense ending; (in the so-called "weak verbs", marked with -ed in English) that appears variously as /d/ or /t/, often assumed to be derived from the verb "to do"; and two separate sets of adjective endings, originally corresponding to a distinction between indefinite semantics ("a man", with a combination of PIE adjective and pronoun endings) and definite semantics ("the man", with endings derived from PIE n-stem nouns).

Note that most modern Germanic languages have lost most of the inherited inflectional morphology as a result of the steady attrition of unstressed endings triggered by the strong initial stress. (Contrast, for example, the Balto-Slavic languages, which have largely kept the Indo-European pitch accent and consequently preserved much of the inherited morphology.) Icelandic and to a lesser extent modern German best preserve the Proto–Germanic inflectional system, with four noun cases, three genders, and well-marked verbs. English and Afrikaans are at the other extreme, with almost no remaining inflectional morphology.

The following shows a typical masculine a-stem noun, Proto-Germanic *fiskaz ("fish"), and its development in the various old literary languages:

Declension of a-stem noun *fiskaz "fish" in various languages
		Proto-Germanic	Gothic	Old Norse	Old High German	Middle High German	Modern German	Old English	Old Saxon	Old Frisian
Singular	Nominative	*fisk-az	fisk-s	fisk-r	visk	visch	Fisch	fisc	fisc	fisk
Singular	Vocative	*fisk	fisk	fisk-r	visk	visch	Fisch	fisc	fisc	fisk
Singular	Accusative	*fisk-ą	fisk	fisk	visk	visch	Fisch	fisc	fisc	fisk
Singular	Genitive	*fisk-as, -is	fisk-is	fisk-s	visk-es	visch-es	Fisch-es	fisc-es < fisc-æs	fisc-as, -es	fisk-is, -es
Singular	Dative	*fisk-ai	fisk-a	fisk-i	visk-a	visch-e	Fisch-(e)	fisc-e < fisc-æ	fisc-a, -e	fisk-a, -i, -e
Singular	Instrumental	*fisk-ō	fisk-a	—	visk-u	—	—	fisc-e < fisc-i	fisc-u	—
Plural	Nominative, Vocative	*fisk-ôs, -ôz	fisk-ōs	fisk-ar	visk-a	visch-e	Fisch-e	fisc-as	fisc-ōs, -ās	fisk-ar, -a
Plural	Accusative	*fisk-anz	fisk-ans	fisk-a	visk-ā	visch-e	Fisch-e	fisc-as	fisc-ōs, -ās	fisk-ar, -a
Plural	Genitive	*fisk-ǫ̂	fisk-ē	fisk-a	visk-ō	visch-e	Fisch-e	fisc-a	fisc-ō, -ā	fisk-a
Plural	Dative	*fisk-amaz	fisk-am	fisk-um, -om	visk-um	visch-en	Fisch-en	fisc-um	fisc-un, -on	fisk-um, -on, -em
Plural	Instrumental	*fisk-amiz	—	—	—	—	—	—	—	—

==== Strong vs. weak nouns and adjectives ====
Originally, adjectives in Proto-Indo-European followed the same declensional classes as nouns. The most common class (the o/ā class) used a combination of o-stem endings for masculine and neuter genders and ā-stems ending for feminine genders, but other common classes (e.g. the i class and u class) used endings from a single vowel-stem declension for all genders, and various other classes existed that were based on other declensions. A quite different set of "pronominal" endings was used for pronouns, determiners, and words with related semantics (e.g., "all", "only").

An important innovation in Proto-Germanic was the development of two separate sets of adjective endings, originally corresponding to a distinction between indefinite semantics ("a man") and definite semantics ("the man"). The endings of indefinite adjectives were derived from a combination of pronominal endings with one of the common vowel-stem adjective declensions – usually the o/ā class (often termed the a/ō class in the specific context of the Germanic languages) but sometimes the i or u classes. Definite adjectives, however, had endings based on n-stem nouns. Originally both types of adjectives could be used by themselves, but already by Proto-Germanic times a pattern evolved whereby definite adjectives had to be accompanied by a determiner with definite semantics (e.g., a definite article, demonstrative pronoun, possessive pronoun, or the like), while indefinite adjectives were used in other circumstances (either accompanied by a word with indefinite semantics such as "a", "one", or "some" or unaccompanied).

In the 19th century, the two types of adjectives – indefinite and definite – were respectively termed "strong" and "weak", names which are still commonly used. These names were based on the appearance of the two sets of endings in modern German. In German, the distinctive case endings formerly present on nouns have largely disappeared, with the result that the load of distinguishing one case from another is almost entirely carried by determiners and adjectives. Furthermore, due to regular sound change, the various definite (n-stem) adjective endings coalesced to the point where only two endings (-e and -en) remain in modern German to express the sixteen possible inflectional categories of the language (masculine/feminine/neuter/plural crossed with nominative/accusative/dative/genitive – modern German merges all genders in the plural). The indefinite (a/ō-stem) adjective endings were less affected by sound change, with six endings remaining (-, -e, -es, -er, -em, -en), cleverly distributed in a way that is capable of expressing the various inflectional categories without too much ambiguity. As a result, the definite endings were thought of as too "weak" to carry inflectional meaning and in need of "strengthening" by the presence of an accompanying determiner, while the indefinite endings were viewed as "strong" enough to indicate the inflectional categories even when standing alone. (This view is enhanced by the fact that modern German largely uses weak-ending adjectives when accompanying an indefinite article, and hence the indefinite/definite distinction no longer clearly applies.) By analogy, the terms "strong" and "weak" were extended to the corresponding noun classes, with a-stem and ō-stem nouns termed "strong" and n-stem nouns termed "weak".

However, in Proto-Germanic – and still in Gothic, the most conservative Germanic language – the terms "strong" and "weak" are not clearly appropriate. For one thing, there were a large number of noun declensions. The a-stem, ō-stem, and n-stem declensions were the most common and represented targets into which the other declensions were eventually absorbed, but this process occurred only gradually. Originally the n-stem declension was not a single declension but a set of separate declensions (e.g., -an, -ōn, -īn) with related endings, and these endings were in no way any "weaker" than the endings of any other declensions. (For example, among the eight possible inflectional categories of a noun — singular/plural crossed with nominative/accusative/dative/genitive — masculine an-stem nouns in Gothic include seven endings, and feminine ōn-stem nouns include six endings, meaning there is very little ambiguity of "weakness" in these endings and in fact much less than in the German "strong" endings.) Although it is possible to group the various noun declensions into three basic categories — vowel-stem, n-stem, and other-consonant-stem (a.k.a. "minor declensions") — the vowel-stem nouns do not display any sort of unity in their endings that supports grouping them together with each other but separate from the n-stem endings.

It is only in later languages that the binary distinction between "strong" and "weak" nouns become more relevant. In Old English, the n-stem nouns form a single, clear class, but the masculine a-stem and feminine ō-stem nouns have little in common with each other, and neither has much similarity to the small class of u-stem nouns. Similarly, in Old Norse, the masculine a-stem and feminine ō-stem nouns have little in common with each other, and the continuations of the masculine an-stem and feminine ōn/īn-stem nouns are also quite distinct. It is only in Middle Dutch and modern German that the various vowel-stem nouns have merged to the point that a binary strong/weak distinction clearly applies.

As a result, newer grammatical descriptions of the Germanic languages often avoid the terms "strong" and "weak" except in conjunction with German itself, preferring instead to use the terms "indefinite" and "definite" for adjectives and to distinguish nouns by their actual stem class.

In English, both sets of adjective endings were lost entirely in the late Middle English period.

== Classification ==
Note that divisions between and among subfamilies of Germanic are rarely precisely defined; most form continuous clines, with adjacent varieties being mutually intelligible and more separated ones not. Within the Germanic language family are East Germanic, West Germanic, and North Germanic. However, East Germanic languages became extinct with Crimean Gothic in the 18th century.

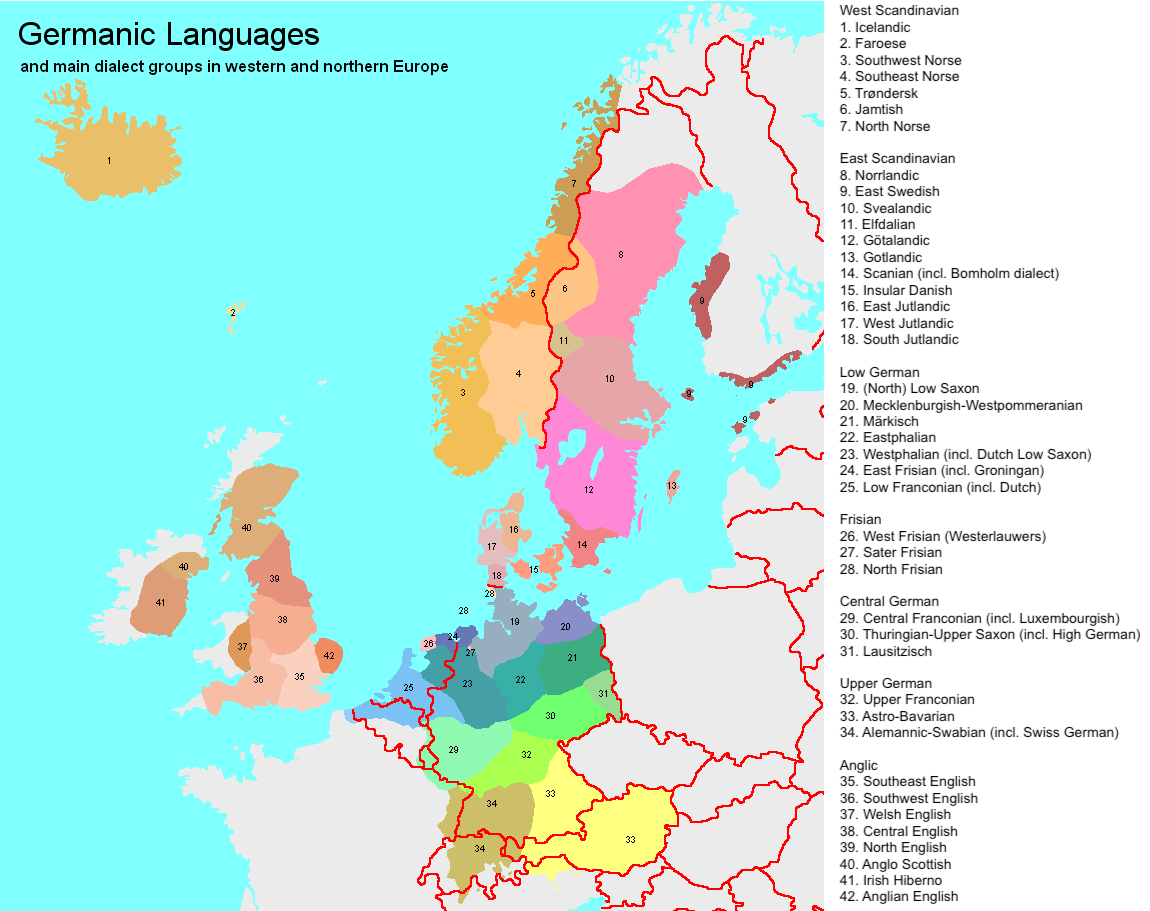
Germanic languages and main dialect groups

All living Germanic languages belong either to the West Germanic or to the North Germanic branch. The West Germanic group is the larger by far, further subdivided into Anglo-Frisian on one hand and Continental West Germanic on the other. Anglo-Frisian notably includes English and all its variants, while Continental West Germanic includes German (standard register and dialects), as well as Dutch (standard register and dialects). East Germanic includes most notably the extinct Gothic and Crimean Gothic languages.

Modern classification looks like this. For a full classification, see List of Germanic languages.

- Germanic
  - West Germanic
    - High German languages (includes Standard German and its dialects)
      - Upper German
        - Alemannic German (includes Alsatian and Swiss German)
        - Bavarian
          - Mòcheno language
          - Cimbrian
          - Hutterite German
      - Yiddish
      - East Franconian (a transitional dialect between Upper and Central German)
      - Central German
        - East Central German
          - Wymysorys
        - West Central German
          - Luxembourgish
          - Pennsylvania Dutch
          - Hunsrik
    - Low German
      - West Low German
      - East Low German
      - Plautdietsch (Mennonite Low German)
    - Low Franconian
      - Dutch and its dialects
      - Afrikaans (a separate standard language)
      - Limburgish (an official minority language)
    - Anglo-Frisian
      - Anglic (or English)
        - English and its dialects
        - Scots in Scotland and Ulster
      - Frisian
        - West Frisian
        - East Frisian
          - Saterland Frisian (last remaining dialect of East Frisian)
        - North Frisian
  - North Germanic
    - West Scandinavian
      - Norwegian (of Western branch origin, but heavily influenced by the Eastern branch)
      - Icelandic
      - Faroese
    - East Scandinavian
      - Danish
      - Swedish
        - Dalecarlian dialects
          - Elfdalian
    - Gutnish
  - East Germanic
    - Gothic †
    - Burgundian †
    - Vandalic †
    - Crimean Gothic †

== Writing ==
=== BC ===
Germanic – Romance language border: • Early Middle Ages • Early Twentieth Century

The earliest evidence of Germanic languages comes from names recorded in the 1st century by Tacitus (especially from his work Germania), but the earliest Germanic writing occurs in a single instance in the 2nd century BC on the Negau helmet, written in Old Italic script.

=== AD ===
From roughly the 1st to the 2nd century AD, or possibly even before AD (as per the dating of the Hole Runestone: 50 BC to 275 AD), certain speakers of early Germanic varieties developed the Elder Futhark, an early form of the runic alphabet. Early runic inscriptions also are largely limited to personal names and difficult to interpret.

The Gothic language was initially written with Elder runes, but starting from the 4th century, such was superseded by the Gothic alphabet, developed by Bishop Ulfilas for his translation of the Bible in the 4th century.

Later, Christian priests and monks who spoke and read Latin, in addition to their native Germanic varieties, began writing the Germanic languages with slightly modified Latin letters. However, throughout the Viking Age and Middle Ages, runic writing remained in common use and development in Scandinavia, acting as the people's writing system alongside the state's Latin script, first diminishing properly when the printing press was introduced; however, the runic tradition survived regionally, especially in the Swedish province of Dalarna – see Dalecarlian runes.

=== Modern writing ===
Modern Germanic languages mostly use an alphabet derived from the Latin Alphabet. In print, German used to be predominately set in blackletter typefaces (e.g., fraktur or schwabacher) until the 1940s, while Kurrent and, since the early 20th century, Sütterlin were formerly used for German handwriting. Yiddish is written using an adapted Hebrew alphabet.

== Vocabulary comparison ==
The table compares cognates in several different Germanic languages. In some cases, the meanings may not be identical in each language.

West Germanic					North Germanic				East Germanic	Reconstructed Proto-Germanic
Anglo-Frisian		Continental			West		East		East Germanic	Reconstructed Proto-Germanic
English	West Frisian	Dutch	Low German	German	Icelandic	Norwegian (Nynorsk)	Swedish	Danish	Gothic †	Reconstructed Proto-Germanic
apple	apel	appel	Appel	Apfel	epli	eple	äpple	æble	apel	*ap(u)laz
can	kinne	kunnen	känen	können	kunna	kunne, kunna	kunna	kunne	kunnan	*kanna
daughter	dochter	dochter	Dochter	Tochter	dóttir	dotter	dotter	datter	dauhtar	*đuχtēr
dead	dea	dood	dod	tot	dauður	daud	död	død	dauþs	*đauđaz
deep	djip	diep	deip	tief	djúpur	djup	djup	dyb	diups	*đeupaz
earth	ierde	aarde	Ir(d)	Erde	jörð	jord	jord	jord	airþa	*erþō
egg	aei, aai	ei	Ei	Ei	egg	egg	ägg	æg	*addi	*ajjaz
fish	fisk	vis	Fisch	Fisch	fiskur	fisk	fisk	fisk	fisks	*fiskaz
go	gean	gaan	gahn	gehen	ganga	gå	gå(nga)	gå (gange)	gaggan	*ȝanȝanan
good	goed	goed	gaud	gut	góð(ur)	god	god	god	gōþ(is)	*ȝōđaz
hear	hearre	horen	hüren	hören	heyra	høyra, høyre	höra	høre	hausjan	*χauzjanan, *χausjanan
I	ik	ik	ick	ich	ég	eg	jag	jeg	ik	*eka
live	libje	leven	lewen	leben	lifa	leva	leva	leve	liban	*liƀēnan
night	nacht	nacht	Nacht	Nacht	nótt	natt	natt	nat	nahts	*naχtz
one	ien	één	ein, en	eins	einn	ein	en	en	áins	*ainaz
ridge	rêch	rug	Rügg(en)	Rücken	hryggur	rygg	rygg	ryg	–	*χruȝjaz
sit	sitte	zitten	sitten	sitzen	sitja	sitja, sitta	sitta	sidde	sitan	*setjanan
seek	sykje	zoeken	säuken	suchen	sækja	søkja	söka	søge	sōkjan	*sōkjanan
that	dat	dat	dat	das	það	det	det	det	þata	*þat
thank (noun)	tank	dank	Dank	Dank	þökk	takk	tack	tak	þagks	*þankaz
true	trou	trouw	tru	treu	tryggur	trygg	trygg	tryg	triggws	*trewwaz
two	twa	twee	twei	zwei, zwo	tveir, tvær, tvö	to	två, tu	to	twái, twós, twa	*twō(u)
us	ús	ons	uns	uns	oss	oss	oss	os	uns	*uns-
way	wei	weg	Weg	Weg	vegur	veg	väg	vej	wigs	weȝaz
white	wyt	wit	witt	weiß	hvítur	kvit	vit	hvid	ƕeits	*χwītaz
word	wurd	woord	Wurd	Wort	orð	ord	ord	ord	waurd	*wurđan
year	jier	jaar	Johr	Jahr	ár	år	år	år	jēr	*jēran

== See also ==
- List of Germanic languages
- Language families and languages
- List of Germanic and Latinate equivalents
- Germanization
- Anglicization
- Norwegianization
- Germanic name
- Germanic verb and its various subordinated articles
- Germanic placename etymology
- German name
- Isogloss
- South Germanic languages
