= Trema =

Trema may refer to:

- a Greek and Latin root meaning hole
- Trema, a term for the two dots (diacritic)
  - Tréma, (French), a diaeresis
- Trema (plant), a genus of about 15 species of small evergreen trees
- Tréma (record label), a French record label, now defunct
- Trema, Croatia, a village near Sveti Ivan Žabno in central Croatia
- a term coined by German neurologist Klaus Conrad in his 1958 monograph on schizophrenia

== See also ==
- Pseudomonas tremae
- Trematoda
- Trematosauria
