= Umlaut =

Umlaut may refer to:

== Language and writing ==
- Umlaut (diacritic), a diacritical mark that consists of two dots ( ¨ ) placed over a letter
  - Metal umlaut, used in names of heavy metal or hard rock bands for visual rather than phonetic effect
- Umlaut (linguistics), a sound change where a vowel was modified to conform more closely to the vowel in the next syllable; in particular:
  - I-mutation, a specific type of umlaut triggered by a following high front vowel; in particular:
    - Germanic umlaut, a prominent instance of i-mutation in the history of the Germanic languages
      - Umlaut vowel, any front rounded vowel (because such vowels appeared in the Germanic languages as a result of Germanic umlaut)
- Two dots (diacritic), the "two side-by-side dots" diacritic, sometimes called an "umlaut", despite its having further linguistic uses, such as diaeresis and schwa

== Other uses ==
- Umlaut (software), an open source link resolver front-end for libraries
- UMLAUT, Clinton McKinnon's experimental rock band from Australia
- Lars Ümlaut, a character playable in the Guitar Hero series of music video games
- Ümlaut, a parodical anarcho-crust band featuring members of Catharsis, including Alexei Rodriguez
- umlaut (company), an international management and engineering consultancy, before 2019 known as P3 group
