= Umlaut (diacritic) =

Diacritic mark to indicate sound shift

◌̈ o

Umlaut
- U+0308 ◌̈ COMBINING DIAERESIS (Note: The code-point shown here is for the generic combining character that may be used with any other symbol. When writing in European languages, it is generally more conventional (and convenient) to use a precomposed character.)

Umlaut (/ˈʊmlaʊt/; UUM-lout) is a name for the two dots diacritical mark (◌̈) as used to indicate in writing (as part of the letters ⟨ä⟩, ⟨ö⟩, and ⟨ü⟩) the result of the historical sound shift due to which former back vowels are now pronounced as front vowels (for example [a], [ɔ], and [ʊ] as [ɛ], [œ], and [ʏ]). (The term Germanic umlaut is also used for the underlying historical sound shift process.)

In its contemporary printed form, the mark consists of two dots placed over the letter to represent the changed vowel sound. In some Romance and other languages, the diaeresis diacritic has the same appearance but a different function.

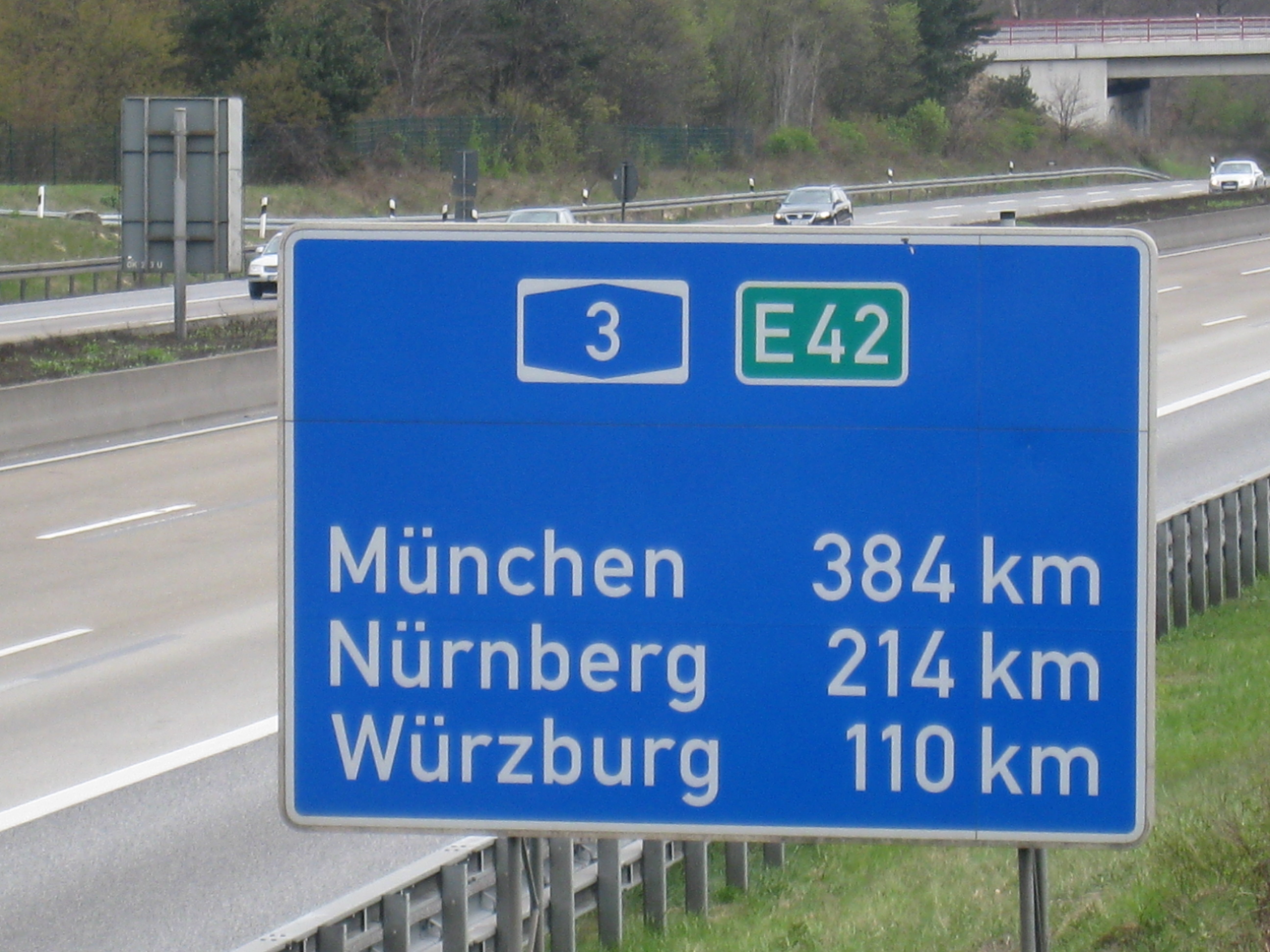
U-umlauts on a German traffic sign

== German origin and current usage ==
Umlaut (literally "changed sound") is the German name of the sound shift phenomenon also known as i-mutation. In German, this term is also used for the corresponding letters ä, ö, and ü (and the diphthong äu) and the sounds that these letters represent. In German, the combination of a letter with the diacritical mark is called Umlaut, while the marks themselves are called Umlautzeichen (literally "umlaut sign").

In German, the umlaut diacritic indicates that the short back vowels and the diphthong [aʊ] are pronounced ("shifted forward in the mouth") as follows:

- [a] → [ɛ]
- [ɔ] → [œ]
- [ʊ] → [ʏ]
- [aʊ] → [ɔʏ]

And the long back vowels are pronounced in the front of the mouth as follows:

- [aː] → [ɛː], in some speakers [eː] (resulting in a merger with /eː/)
- [oː] → [øː]
- [uː] → [yː]

In modern German orthography, the affected graphemes ⟨a⟩, ⟨o⟩, ⟨u⟩, and ⟨au⟩ are written as ⟨ä⟩, ⟨ö⟩, ⟨ü⟩, and ⟨äu⟩, i.e. they are written with the umlaut diacritic, which looks identical to the diaeresis mark used in other European languages and is represented by the same Unicode character.

== History ==
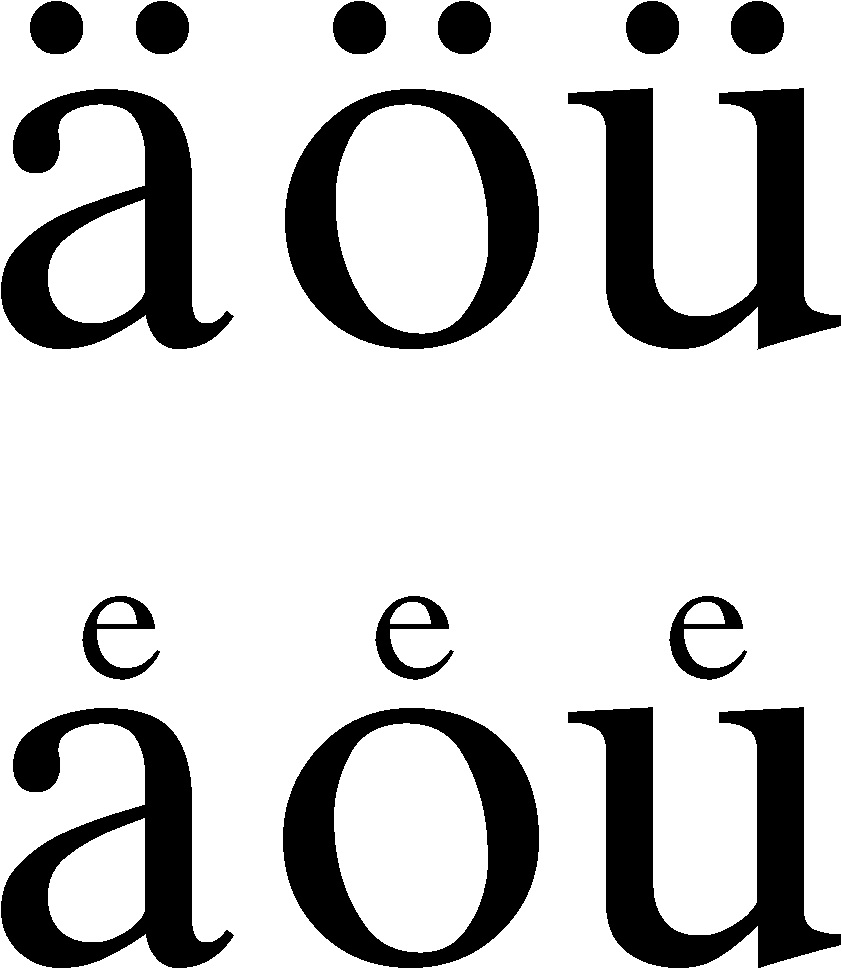
Modern and old forms of umlaut

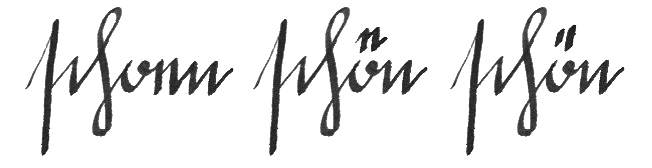
Illustration of the development of umlaut: schoen ⇨ schoͤn ⇨ schön ('beautiful'). The Sütterlin script used here is a later development, however.

The Germanic umlaut is a specific historical phenomenon of vowel-fronting in German and other Germanic languages, including English. English examples are 'man ~ men' and 'foot ~ feet' (from Proto-Germanic *fōts, pl. *fōtiz), but English orthography does not indicate this vowel change using the umlaut diacritic.

German phonological umlaut was present in the Old High German period and continued to develop in Middle High German. From the Middle High German period, it was sometimes denoted in written German by adding an e to the affected vowel, either after the vowel or, in small form, above it. This can still be seen in some names, e.g. Goethe, Mueller-Stahl, Staedtler. (Note: Note that not all such combinations are necessarily umlauts: In the town names Coesfeld and Raesfeld, for example, the e merely lengthens the preceding vowel ([oː] and [aː], respectively).) In medieval German manuscripts, other digraphs were also commonly written using superscripts. In bluome ("flower"), for example, the ⟨o⟩ was frequently placed above the ⟨u⟩ (blůme). This letter survives now only in Czech. Compare also ⟨ñ⟩ for the digraph nn, with the tilde as a superscript ⟨n⟩.

In blackletter handwriting, as used in German manuscripts of the later Middle Ages, and also in many printed texts of the early modern period, the superscript ⟨e⟩ still had a form that would be recognisable as an ⟨e⟩, but in manuscript writing, umlauted vowels could be indicated by two dots since the late medieval period.

In the forms of handwriting that emerged in the early modern period (Kurrent, and in the 20th century Sütterlin) the letter ⟨e⟩ was composed of two short vertical lines very close together, and the superscript ⟨e⟩ looked like two tiny strokes. Even from the 16th century, the handwritten convention of indicating umlaut by two dots placed above the affected vowel is also found in printed texts.

Unusual umlaut designs are sometimes also created for graphic design purposes, such as to fit umlaut dots into tightly spaced lines of text. This may include umlaut dots placed vertically or inside the body of the letter.

== Printing conventions in German ==
When typing German with a keyboard that doesn't have umlaut letters, it is usual to replace them with the underlying vowel followed by an ⟨e⟩. So, for example, "Schröder" becomes "Schroeder". As the pronunciation differs greatly between the normal letter and the umlaut, simply omitting the dots would be incorrect. The result would often be a different word, as in schon "already", schön "beautiful"; or a different grammatic form, e.g. Mutter "mother", Mütter "mothers".

Despite this, the umlauted letters are not considered to be separate letters of the alphabet in German, in contrast to the situation in other Germanic languages.

When alphabetically sorting German words, the umlaut is usually not distinguished from the underlying vowel, although if two words differ only by an umlaut, the umlauted one comes second, for example:

1. schon
2. schön
3. schonen

There is a second system in limited use, mostly for sorting names (such as in telephone directories), which treats letters with umlauts as their base equivalents followed by e.

1. schön
2. schon
3. schonen

Austrian telephone directories insert ö after oz.

1. schon
2. schonen
3. schön

Swiss keyboard layout

In Switzerland, capital umlauts are sometimes printed as digraphs, in other words, ⟨Ae⟩, ⟨Oe⟩, ⟨Ue⟩, instead of ⟨Ä⟩, ⟨Ö⟩, ⟨Ü⟩ (see German alphabet § Umlaut diacritic usage for an elaboration). This is because Swiss typewriter keyboards use the same keys for French accents (in Swiss French) as are used for German umlauts (in Swiss German) and which version is active (on a computer) is chosen by system setting. Consequently to apply an accent or umlaut to a capital letter requires use of a dead key mechanism.

== Borrowing of German umlaut notation ==
Some languages have borrowed some of the forms of the German letters Ä, Ö, or Ü, including Azerbaijani, Estonian, Finnish, Hungarian, Karelian, some of the Sami languages, Slovak, Swedish, and Turkish. This indicates sounds similar to the corresponding umlauted letters in German. In spoken Scandinavian languages the grammatical umlaut change is used (singular to plural, derivations, etc.) but the character used differs between languages. In Finnish, a/ä and o/ö change systematically in suffixes according to the rules of vowel harmony. In Hungarian, where long vowels are indicated with an acute accent, the umlaut notation has been expanded with a version of the umlaut which looks like double acute accents, indicating a blend of umlaut and acute. Contrast: short ö; long ő.

The Estonian alphabet has borrowed ⟨ä⟩, ⟨ö⟩, and ⟨ü⟩ from German; Swedish and Finnish have ⟨ä⟩ and ⟨ö⟩; and Slovak has ⟨ä⟩. In Estonian, Swedish, Finnish, and Sami ⟨ä⟩ and ⟨ö⟩ denote [æ] and [ø], respectively. Hungarian and Turkish have ⟨ö⟩ and ⟨ü⟩.

Slovak uses the letter ⟨ä⟩ to denote [e] (or a bit archaic but still correct [ɛɐ]). The sign is called dve bodky [ˈdʋe ˈbɔtki] ("two dots"), and the full name of the letter ä is široké e [ˈʂirɔkeː ˈe] ("wide e"). The similar word dvojbodka [ˈdʋɔjbɔtka] ("double dot") however refers to the colon.

In these languages, with the exception of Hungarian, the replacement rule for situations where the umlaut character is not available, is to simply use the underlying unaccented character instead. Hungarian does not have official replacement rule but accents are most commonly omitted when not available which may result in some ambiguity. Previously in telegrams and telex messages similar rules were followed as German and replaced ⟨ö⟩ and ⟨ü⟩ with ⟨oe⟩ and ⟨ue⟩ respectively. The same rule is followed for the near-lookalikes ⟨ő⟩ and ⟨ű⟩ while accented ⟨á⟩ and ⟨é⟩ were written as ⟨aa⟩ and ⟨ee⟩ respectively but this is not commonly used today since telegrams and telex died out.

In Luxembourgish (Lëtzebuergesch), ⟨ä⟩ and ⟨ë⟩ represent stressed [æ] and [ə] (schwa) respectively. The letters ⟨ü⟩ and ⟨ö⟩ do not occur in native Luxembourgish words, but at least the former is common in words borrowed from standard German.

When Turkish switched from the Arabic to the Latin alphabet in 1928, it adopted a number of diacritics borrowed from various languages, including ⟨ü⟩ and ⟨ö⟩ from German (probably reinforced by their use in languages like Swedish, Hungarian, etc.). These Turkish graphemes represent sounds similar to their respective values in German. They are regarded as separate letters in the Turkish alphabet, following the respective non-umlauted letters o and u.

As the borrowed diacritic has lost its relationship to Germanic i-mutation, they are in some languages considered independent graphemes, and cannot be replaced with ⟨ae⟩, ⟨oe⟩, or ⟨ue⟩ as in German. In Estonian and Finnish, for example, these latter diphthongs have independent meanings. Even some Germanic languages, such as Swedish (which does have a transformation analogous to the German umlaut, called omljud), treat them always as independent letters. In collation, this means they have their own positions in the alphabet, for example at the end ("A–Ö" or "A–Ü", not "A–Z") as in Swedish, Estonian and Finnish, which means that the dictionary order is different from German. The transformations ä → ae and ö → oe can, therefore, be considered less appropriate for these languages, although Swedish and Finnish passports use the transformation to render ö and ä (and å as aa) in the machine-readable zone. In contexts of technological limitation, e.g. in English based systems, Swedes can either be forced to omit the diacritics or use the two letter system.

When typing in Norwegian, the letters Æ and Ø might be replaced with Ä and Ö respectively if the former are not available. If ä is not available either, it is appropriate to use ae. The same goes for ö and oe. While ae has a great resemblance to the letter æ and, therefore, does not impede legibility, the digraph oe is likely to reduce the legibility of a Norwegian text. This especially applies to the digraph øy, which would be rendered in the more cryptic form oey. Also in Danish, Ö has been used in place of Ø in some older texts and to distinguish between open and closed ö-sounds and when confusion with other symbols could occur, e.g. on maps. The Danish/Norwegian Ø is like the German Ö a development of OE, to be compared with the French Œ.

Early Volapük used Fraktur a, o and u as different from Antiqua ones. Later, the Fraktur forms were replaced with umlauted vowels.

The usage of umlaut-like diacritic vowels, particularly ü, occurs in the romanization of languages that do not use the Roman alphabet, such as Chinese. For example, Mandarin Chinese 女 [ny˨˩˦] ("female") is romanized as nǚ in Hanyu Pinyin. Tibetan pinyin uses ä, ö, ü with approximately their German values.

The Cyrillic letters ӓ, ӧ, ӱ are used in Mari, Khanty, and other languages for approximately [æ], [ø], and [y]. These directly parallel the German umlaut ä, ö, ü. Other vowels using a double dot to modify their values in various minority languages of Russia are ӛ, ӫ, and ӹ.

== Use of the umlaut for special effect ==
The two dot diacritic can be used in "sensational spellings" or foreign branding, for example in advertising, or for other special effects, where it is usually called an umlaut (rather than a diaeresis). Blue Öyster Cult, Motörhead, Mötley Crüe and Häagen-Dazs are examples of such usage. The Brontë sisters are so-called because their Irish father, Patrick Brunty, used the device to Anglicise the family name.

== Subscript umlaut ==
The International Phonetic Alphabet uses a double dot below a letter, a notation it calls "subscript umlaut" to indicate breathy (murmured) voice, (for example Hindi [kʊm̤ar] "potter". (Note: The IPA Handbook calls the mark "subscript umlaut", in contrast with the Unicode Consortium's choice of "diaeresis below".)) The ALA-LC romanization system provides for its use and is one of the main schemes to romanize Persian (for example, rendering ⟨ض⟩ as ⟨z̤⟩). The notation was used to write some Asian languages in Latin script, for example Red Karen.

== See also ==
- Two dots (disambiguation)
- Trema (disambiguation)
