= Germanic umlaut =

Type of vowel change

The Germanic umlaut (sometimes called i-umlaut or i-mutation) is a type of linguistic umlaut in which a back vowel changes to the associated front vowel (fronting) or a front vowel becomes closer to /i/ (raising) when the following syllable contains /i/, /iː/, or /j/.

It took place separately in various Germanic languages starting around 450 or 500 CE and affected all of the early languages except Gothic. An example of the resulting vowel alternation is the English plural foot ~ feet (from Proto-Germanic *fōts, pl. *fōtiz). Germanic umlaut, as covered in this article, does not include other historical vowel phenomena that operated in the history of the Germanic languages such as Germanic a-mutation and the various language-specific processes of u-mutation, nor the earlier Indo-European ablaut (vowel gradation), which is observable in the conjugation of Germanic strong verbs such as sing/sang/sung.

While Germanic umlaut has had important consequences for all modern Germanic languages, its effects are particularly apparent in German, because vowels resulting from umlaut are generally spelled with a specific set of letters: ⟨ä⟩, ⟨ö⟩, and ⟨ü⟩, usually pronounced /ɛ/ (formerly /æ/), /ø/, and /y/. Umlaut is a form of assimilation or vowel harmony, the process by which one speech sound is altered to make it more like another adjacent sound. If a word has two vowels with one far back in the mouth and the other far forward, more effort is required to pronounce the word than if the vowels were closer together; therefore, one possible linguistic development is for these two vowels to be drawn closer together.

== Description ==
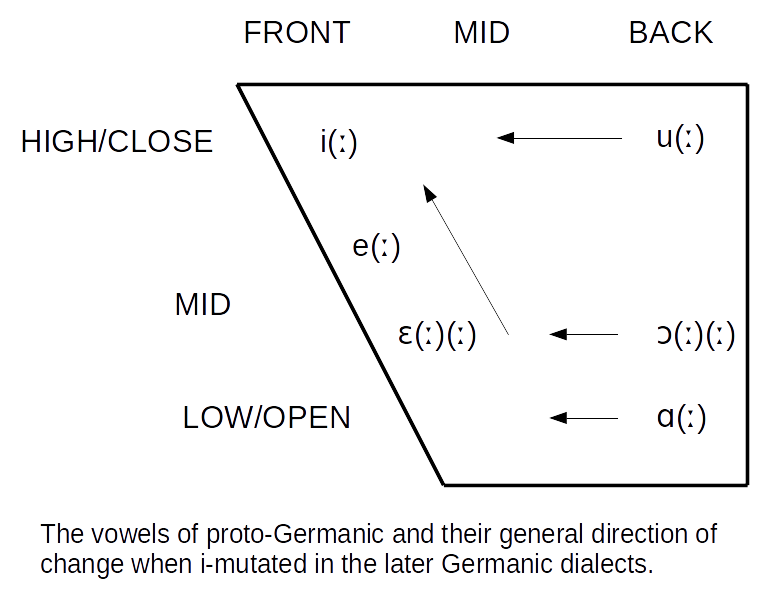
The vowels of proto-Germanic and their general direction of change when i-mutated in the later Germanic dialects

Germanic umlaut is a specific historical example of this process that took place in the unattested earliest stages of Old English and Old Norse and apparently later in Old High German, and some other old Germanic languages. The precise developments varied from one language to another, but the general trend was this:

- Whenever a back vowel (/ɑ/, /o/ or /u/, whether long or short) occurred in a syllable and the front vowel /i/ or the front glide /j/ occurred in the next, the vowel in the first syllable was fronted (usually to /æ/, /ø/, and /y/ respectively). Thus, for example, West Germanic *mūsi "mice" shifted to proto-Old English *mȳsi, which eventually developed to modern mice, while the singular form *mūs lacked a following /i/ and was unaffected, eventually becoming modern mouse.
- When a low or mid-front vowel occurred in a syllable and the front vowel /i/ or the front glide /j/ occurred in the next, the vowel in the first syllable was raised. This happened less often in the Germanic languages, partly because of earlier vowel harmony in similar contexts. However, for example, proto-Old English /æ/ became /e/ in */bæddj-/ > /bedd/ 'bed'.

The fronted variant caused by umlaut was originally allophonic (a variant sound automatically predictable from context), but it later became phonemic when the context was lost but the variant sound remained. The following examples show how, when final -i was lost, the variant sound -ȳ- became a new phoneme in Old English.

Umlaut and final vowel
Process	Language	Singular	Plural	Singular	Plural
Original form	Proto-Germanic	*mūs	*mūsiz	*fō(t)s	*fōtiz
Loss of final -z	West Germanic	*mūs	*mūsi	*fōt	*fōti
Germanic umlaut	Pre-Old English	*mūs	*mȳsi	*fōt	*fø̄ti
Loss of i after a heavy syllable	Pre-Old English	mūs	mȳs	fōt	fø̄t
Unrounding of ø̄ (> ē)	Most Old English dialects	mūs	mȳs	fōt	fēt
Unrounding of ȳ (> ī)	Early Middle English	mūs	mīs	fōt	fēt
Great Vowel Shift	Early Modern and Modern English	/maʊs/ ("mouse")	/maɪs/ ("mice")	/fʊt/ ("foot")	/fiːt/ ("feet")

== Outcomes in modern spelling and pronunciation ==
The following table surveys how Proto-Germanic vowels which later underwent i-umlaut generally appear in modern languages—though there are many exceptions to these patterns owing to other sound changes and chance variations. The table gives two West Germanic examples (English and German) and two North Germanic examples (Swedish, from the east, and Icelandic, from the west). Spellings are marked by pointy brackets (⟨...⟩) and pronunciation, given in the international phonetic alphabet, in slashes (/.../).

Proto-Germanic vowel	example word	usual modern reflex after i-umlaut			
Proto-Germanic vowel	example word	English	German	Swedish	Icelandic
ɑ	*manniz ('people')	⟨e⟩, /ɛ/ (men)	⟨ä⟩, /ɛ/ (Männer)	⟨ä⟩, /ɛ/ (män)	⟨e⟩, /ɛ/ (menn)
ɑː	*gansiz ('geese'), which became *gą̄si in North Germanic and North Sea Germanic, though not in German	⟨ea⟩, ⟨ee⟩, /iː/ (geese)	⟨ä⟩, /ɛ/ (Gänse)	⟨ä⟩, /ɛ/ (gäss)	⟨æ⟩, /aɪ/ (gæs)
o	no single example in all languages (Note: Examples of Common Germanic *e and *o before *i or *j are vanishingly rare. Proto-Germanic *o has been included in this table, however, to ensure that all the outcomes of i-umlaut in the modern languages are accounted for. *e had been raised to *i before *i and *j earlier in the development of Common Germanic. *o, meanwhile, only existed where *u had changed to *o, which never happened before *i and *j. Most examples of the i-umlaut of *o, therefore, occur in words borrowed into Germanic (such as *oli, from Latin oleum), or in words where *o arose due to later processes specific to each daughter language of Germanic. Similarly, many examples of ö in Modern German come from a later change of ü to ö (e.g., *kuningaz > Künig > König 'king').)	⟨e⟩, /ɛ/ (*obisu > eaves)	⟨ö⟩, /øː/ (*oli > Öl)	⟨ö⟩, /œ/ (*hnotiz > nötter)	⟨e⟩, /ɛ/ (*komiz > kemur)
ɔː	*fōtiz ('feet')	⟨ea⟩, ⟨ee⟩, /iː/ (feet)	⟨ü⟩, /yː/ (Füße)	⟨ö⟩, /œ/ (fötter)	⟨æ⟩, /aɪ/ (fætur)
u	*fullijaną ('fill')	⟨i⟩, /ɪ/ (fill)	⟨ü⟩, /ʏ/ (füllen)	⟨y⟩, /ʏ/ (fylla)	⟨y⟩, /ɪ/ (fylla)
uː	*lūsiz ('lice')	⟨i⟩, /aɪ/ (lice)	⟨eu, äu⟩, /ɔʏ̯/ (Läuse)	⟨ö⟩, /œ/ (löss)	⟨ý⟩, /i/ (lýs)
ɑu	*hauzjaną ('hear')	⟨ea⟩, ⟨ee⟩, /iː/ (hear)	⟨ö⟩, /øː/ (hören)	⟨ö⟩, /øː/ (höra)	⟨ey⟩, /ɛɪ/ (heyra)
ɑi	*hailijaną ('heal')	⟨ea⟩, ⟨ee⟩, /iː/ (heal)	⟨ei⟩, /aɪ̯/ (heilen)	⟨e⟩, /eː/ (hela)	⟨ei⟩, /ɛɪ/ (heila)
eu, iu	*steurjaną ('steer')	⟨ea⟩, ⟨ee⟩, /iː/ (steer)	⟨eu⟩, /ɔʏ̯/ (steuern)	⟨y⟩, /yː/ (styra)	⟨ý⟩, /i/ (stýra)

Whereas modern English does not have any special letters for vowels produced by i-umlaut, in German the letters ⟨ä⟩, ⟨ö⟩, and ⟨ü⟩ almost always represent umlauted vowels (see further below). Likewise, Swedish ⟨ä⟩, ⟨ö⟩, and ⟨y⟩ and Icelandic ⟨æ⟩, ⟨y⟩, ⟨ý⟩, and ⟨ey⟩ are almost always used for vowels produced by i-umlaut. However, German ⟨eu⟩ represents vowels from multiple sources, which is also the case for ⟨e⟩ in Swedish and Icelandic.

=== German orthography ===
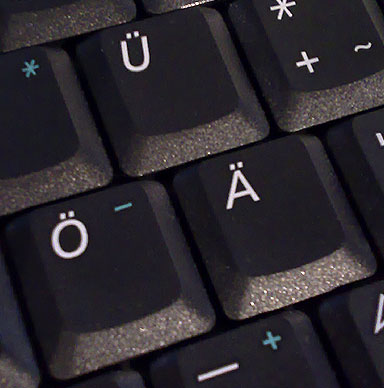
⟨Ä⟩, ⟨Ö⟩, ⟨Ü⟩ on a German computer keyboard

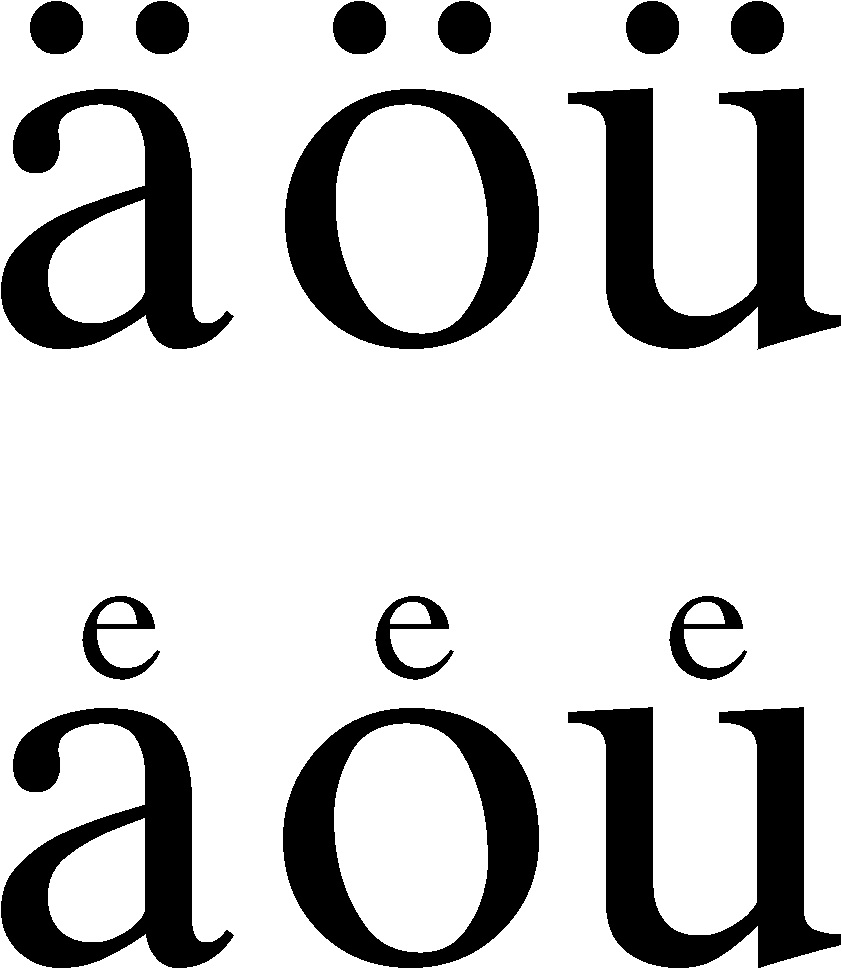
New and old notation of umlauted vowels

German orthography is generally consistent in its representation of i-umlaut. The umlaut diacritic, consisting of two dots above the vowel, is used for the fronted vowels, making the historical process much more visible in the modern language than is the case in English: ⟨a⟩ – ⟨ä⟩, ⟨o⟩ – ⟨ö⟩, ⟨u⟩ – ⟨ü⟩, ⟨au⟩ – ⟨äu⟩. This is a neat solution when pairs of words with and without umlaut mutation are compared, as in umlauted plurals like Mutter – Mütter ("mother" – "mothers").

However, in a small number of words, a vowel affected by i-umlaut is not marked with the umlaut diacritic because its origin is not obvious. Either there is no unumlauted equivalent or they are not recognized as a pair because the meanings have drifted apart. The adjective fertig ("ready, finished"; originally "ready to go") contains an umlaut mutation, but it is spelled with ⟨e⟩ rather than ⟨ä⟩ as its relationship to Fahrt ("journey") has, for most speakers of the language, been lost from sight. Likewise, alt ("old") has the comparative älter ("older"), but the noun from this is spelled Eltern ("parents"). Aufwand ("effort") has the verb aufwenden ("to spend, to dedicate") and the adjective aufwendig ("requiring effort") though the 1996 spelling reform now permits the alternative spelling aufwändig (but not *aufwänden). For denken, see below.

Some words have umlaut diacritics that do not mark a vowel produced by the sound change of umlaut. This includes loanwords such as Känguru from English kangaroo, and Büro from French bureau. Here the diacritic is a purely phonological marker, indicating that the English and French sounds (or at least, the approximation of them used in German) are identical to the native German umlauted sounds. Similarly, Big Mac was originally spelt Big Mäc in German. In borrowings from Latin and Greek, Latin ⟨ae⟩, ⟨oe⟩, or Greek ⟨αι⟩ ai, ⟨οι⟩ oi, are rendered in German as ä and ö respectively (Ägypten, "Egypt", or Ökonomie, "economy"). However, Latin ⟨y⟩ and Greek ⟨υ⟩ are written y in German instead of ü (Psychologie). There are also several non-borrowed words where the vowels ö and ü have not arisen through historical umlaut, but due to rounding of an earlier unrounded front vowel (possibly from the labial/labialized consonants w/f/sch occurring on both sides), such as fünf ("five"; from Middle High German vinf), zwölf ("twelve"; from zwelf), and schöpfen ("create"; from schepfen).

==== Substitution ====
When German words (names in particular) are written in the basic Latin alphabet, umlauts are usually substituted with ⟨ae⟩, ⟨oe⟩ and ⟨ue⟩ to differentiate them from simple ⟨a⟩, ⟨o⟩, and ⟨u⟩.

==== Orthography and design history ====
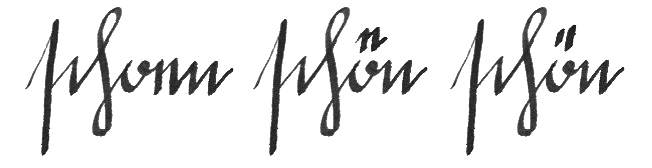
Development of the umlaut (anachronistically lettered in Sütterlin): schoen becomes schön via schoͤn 'beautiful'.

The German phonological umlaut is present in the Old High German period and continues to develop in Middle High German. From the Middle High German, it was sometimes denoted in written German by adding an ⟨e⟩ to the affected vowel, either after the vowel or, in the small form, above it. This can still be seen in some names: Goethe, Goebbels, Staedtler. (Note: In medieval manuscripts, other digraphs could also be written using superscripts: in bluome ("flower"), for example, the ⟨o⟩ was frequently placed above the ⟨u⟩, although this letter ⟨ů⟩ survives now only in Czech. Compare also the development of the tilde as a superscript ⟨n⟩.)

In blackletter handwriting, as used in German manuscripts of the later Middle Ages and also in many printed texts of the early modern period, the superscript ⟨e⟩ still had a form that would now be recognisable as an ⟨e⟩, but in manuscript writing, umlauted vowels could be indicated by two dots since the late medieval period.

Unusual umlaut designs are sometimes also created for graphic design purposes, such as to fit an umlaut into tightly-spaced lines of text. This may include umlauts placed vertically or inside the body of the letter.

== Morphological effects ==
Although umlaut was not a grammatical process, umlauted vowels often serve to distinguish grammatical forms (and thus show similarities to ablaut when viewed synchronically), as can be seen in the English word man. In ancient Germanic, it and some other words had the plural suffix *-iz, with the same vowel as the singular. As it contained an *i, this suffix caused fronting of the vowel and, when the suffix later disappeared, the mutated vowel remained as the only plural marker: men. In English, such plurals are rare: man, woman, tooth, goose, foot, mouse, louse, brother (archaic or specialized plural in brethren), and cow (poetic and dialectal plural in kine). This effect also can be found in a few fossilized diminutive forms, such as kitten from cat, kernel from corn, and the feminine vixen from fox. Umlaut is conspicuous when it occurs in one of such a pair of forms, but there are many mutated words without an unmutated parallel form. Germanic actively derived causative weak verbs from ordinary strong verbs by applying a suffix, which later caused umlaut, to a past tense form. Some of these survived into modern English as doublets of verbs, including fell and set versus fall and sit. Umlaut could occur in borrowings as well if a stressed vowel was coloured by a subsequent front vowel, such as German Köln, "Cologne", from Latin Colonia, or Käse, "cheese", from Latin caseus.

=== Parallel umlauts in some modern Germanic languages ===
Germanic	German	English	Dutch	Limburgish	Swedish	Faroese
*fallaną – *fallijaną	fallen – fällen	to fall – to fell	vallen – vellen	valle – velle	falla – fälla	falla – fella
*fōts – *fōtiz	Fuß – Füße	foot – feet	voet – voeten (no umlaut)	voot – veut	fot – fötter	fótur – føtur
*aldaz – *alþizô – *alþistaz	alt – älter – am ältesten	old – elder – eldest	oud – ouder – oudst (no umlaut)	aad – ajer – aadjst (no umlaut)	gammal – äldre – äldst (irregular)	gamal – eldri – elstur (irregular)
*fullaz – *fullijaną	voll – füllen	full – fill	vol – vullen	vol – völle	full – fylla	fullur – fylla
*langaz – *langīn/*langiþō	lang – Länge	long – length	lang – lengte	lank – lengde	lång – längd	langur – longd
*lūs – *lūsiz	Laus – Läuse	louse – lice	luis – luizen (no umlaut)	loes – luus	lus – löss	lús – lýs

The Standard Dutch pair luis – luizen differs from the rest in that it already features a front diphthong /œy/ (/lœys/ – /ˈlœyzə(n)/), which ultimately comes from a long close back monophthong /uː/, retained in Limburgish dialects in the singular form. In the Dutch-based orthography usually used to write Limburgish, the digraph ⟨eu⟩ and the double ⟨uu⟩ have the same phonetic values as the long versions of ⟨ö⟩ and ⟨ü⟩ in German, that is /øː/ and /yː/, whereas ⟨oe⟩ is /uː/, the back counterpart of /yː/.

== Umlaut in Germanic verbs ==
Some interesting examples of umlaut involve vowel distinctions in Germanic verbs. Although these are often subsumed under the heading "ablaut" in tables of Germanic irregular verbs, they are a separate phenomenon.

=== Present stem Umlaut in strong verbs ===
A variety of umlaut occurs in the second and third person singular forms of the present tense of some Germanic strong verbs. For example, German fangen ("to catch") has the present tense ich fange, du fängst, er fängt. The verb geben ("give") has the present tense ich gebe, du gibst, er gibt, but the shift e→i would not be a normal result of umlaut in German. There are, in fact, two distinct phenomena at play here; the first is indeed umlaut as it is best known, but the second is older and occurred already in Proto-Germanic itself. In both cases, a following *i triggered a vowel change, but in Proto-Germanic, it affected only *e. The effect on back vowels did not occur until hundreds of years later, after the Germanic languages had already begun to split up: *fą̄haną, *fą̄hidi with no umlaut of *a, but *gebaną, *gibidi with umlaut of *e.

=== Present stem Umlaut in weak verbs (Rückumlaut) ===
The German word Rückumlaut ("reverse umlaut"), sometimes known in English as "unmutation", is a term given to the vowel distinction between present and preterite forms of certain Germanic weak verbs. These verbs exhibit the dental suffix used to form the preterite of weak verbs, and also exhibit what appears to be the vowel gradation characteristic of strong verbs. Examples in English are think/thought, bring/brought, tell/told, sell/sold. The phenomenon can also be observed in some German verbs including brennen/brannte ("burn/burnt"), kennen/kannte ("know/knew"), and a handful of others. In some dialects, particularly of western Germany, the phenomenon is preserved in many more forms (for example Luxembourgish stellen/gestallt, "to put", and Limburgish tèlle/talj/getaldj, "to tell, count"). The cause lies with the insertion of the semivowel /j/ between the verb stem and inflectional ending. This /j/ triggers umlaut, as explained above. In short-stem verbs, the /j/ is present in both the present and preterite. In long-stem verbs however, the /j/ fell out of the preterite. Thus, while short-stem verbs exhibit umlaut in all tenses, long-stem verbs only do so in the present. When the German philologist Jacob Grimm first attempted to explain the phenomenon, he assumed that the lack of umlaut in the preterite resulted from the reversal of umlaut. In actuality, umlaut never occurred in the first place. Nevertheless, the term "Rückumlaut" makes some sense since the verb exhibits a shift from an umlauted vowel in the basic form (the infinitive) to a plain vowel in the respective inflections.

=== Umlaut as a subjunctive marker ===
In German, some verbs that display a back vowel in the past tense undergo umlaut in the subjunctive mood: singen/sang (ind.) → sänge (subj.) ("sing/sang"); fechten/focht (ind.) → föchte (subj.) ("fence/fenced"). Again, this is due to the presence of a following i in the optative verb endings in the Old High German period.

== Historical survey by language ==
=== West Germanic languages ===
Although umlaut functioned similarly across the West Germanic languages, the specific words affected and the outcomes of the process vary between them. One notable factor is the loss of word-final -i after heavy syllables: in the southern languages (Old High German, Old Dutch, Old Saxon), this often resulted in no umlaut, whereas in the northern languages (Old English, Old Frisian), umlaut frequently remains present. Compare Old English ġiest "guest", which shows umlaut, and Old High German gast, which does not, both from Proto-Germanic *gastiz. That may mean that there was dialectal variation in the timing and spread of the two changes, with final loss happening before umlaut in the south but after umlaut in the north. On the other hand, umlaut may have still been partly allophonic, and the loss of the conditioning sound may have triggered an "un-umlauting" of the preceding vowel. Nevertheless, medial *-ij- consistently triggers umlaut although its subsequent loss is universal in West Germanic except for Old Saxon and early Old High German.

==== I-mutation in Old English ====
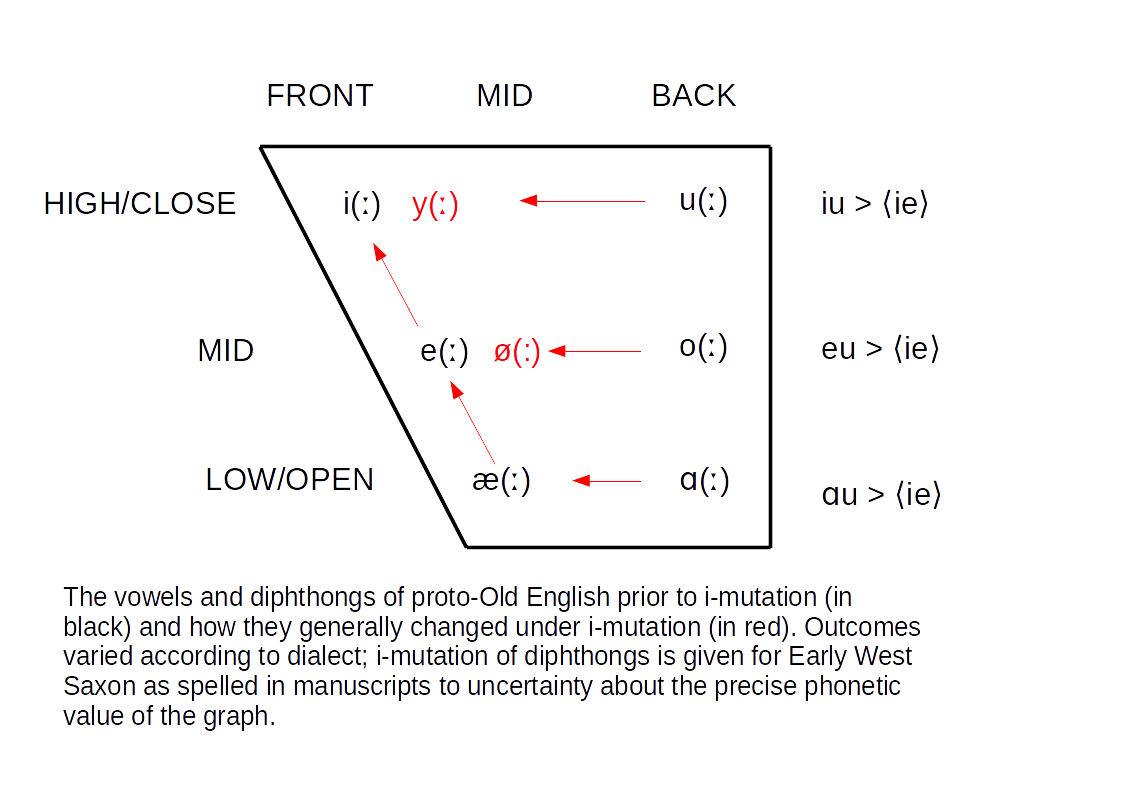
The vowels and diphthongs of proto-Old English prior to i-mutation (in black) and how they generally changed under i-mutation (in red). Outcomes varied according to dialect; i-mutation of diphthongs is given for Early West Saxon as spelled in manuscripts due to uncertainty about the precise phonetic value of the graph.

I-mutation generally affected Old English vowels as follows in each of the main dialects. It led to the introduction into Old English of the new sounds /y(ː)/, /ø(ː)/ (which, in most varieties, soon turned into /e(ː)/), and a sound written in Early West Saxon manuscripts as ⟨ie⟩ but whose phonetic value is debated.

i-mutation
Original	i-mutated			Examples and notes
Original	West Saxon	Anglian	Kentish	Examples and notes
a	æ, e		æ, e > e	bacan "to bake", bæcþ "(he/she) bakes". a > e particularly before nasal consonants: mann "person", menn "people"
ā	ǣ			lār "teaching" (cf. "lore"), lǣran "to teach"
æ	e			þæc "covering" (cf. "thatch"), þeccan "to cover"
e	i			not clearly attested due to earlier Germanic *e > *i before *i, *j
o	ø > e			Latin olium, Old English øle > ele.
ō	ø̄ > ē			fōt "foot", fø̄t > fēt "feet".
u	y		y > e	murnan "to mourn", myrnþ "(he/she) mourns"
ū	ȳ		ȳ > ē	mūs "mouse", mȳs "mice"
ea	ie > y	e		eald "old", ieldra, eldra "older" (cf. "elder")
ēa	īe > ȳ	ē		nēah "near" (cf. "nigh"), nīehst "nearest" (cf. "next")
eo	io > eo			examples are rare due to earlier Germanic *e > *i before *i, *j. io became eo in most later varieties of Old English
ēo	īo > ēo			examples are rare due to earlier Germanic *e > *i before *i, *j. īo became ēo in most later varieties of Old English
io	ie > y	io, eo		*fiohtan "to fight", fieht "(he/she) fights". io became eo in most later varieties of Old English, giving alternations like beornan "to burn", biernþ "(he/she) burns"
īo	īe > ȳ	īo, ēo		līoht "light", līehtan "illuminate". īo became ēo in most later varieties of Old English, giving alternations like sēoþan "to boil" (cf. "seethe"), sīeþþ "(he/she) boils"

I-mutation is particularly visible in the inflectional and derivational morphology of Old English since it affected so many of the Old English vowels. Of 16 basic vowels and diphthongs in Old English, only the four vowels ǣ, ē, i, ī were unaffected by i-mutation. Although i-mutation was originally triggered by an /i(ː)/ or /j/ in the syllable following the affected vowel, by the time of the surviving Old English texts, the /i(ː)/ or /j/ had generally changed (usually to /e/) or been lost entirely, with the result that i-mutation generally appears as a morphological process that affects a certain (seemingly arbitrary) set of forms. These are most common forms affected:

- The plural, and genitive/dative singular, forms of consonant-declension nouns (Proto-Germanic (PGmc) *-iz), as compared to the nominative/accusative singular – e.g., fōt "foot," fēt "feet;" mūs "mouse," mȳs "mice." Many more words were affected by this change in Old English versus modern English, for example, bōc "book," bēċ "books;" frēond "friend," frīend "friends."
- The second and third person present singular indicative of strong verbs (Pre-Old-English (Pre-OE) *-ist, *-iþ), as compared to the infinitive and other present-tense forms – e.g. helpan "to help," helpe "(I) help," hilpst "(you sg.) help," hilpþ "(he/she) helps," helpaþ "(we/you pl./they) help."
- The comparative form of some adjectives (Pre-OE *-ira < PGmc *-izǭ, Pre-OE *-ist < PGmc *-istaz), as compared to the base form – e.g. eald "old," ieldra "older," ieldest "oldest" (cf. "elder, eldest").
- Throughout the first class of weak verbs (original suffix -jan), as compared to the forms from which the verbs were derived – e.g. fōda "food," fēdan "to feed" < Pre-OE *fōdjan; lār "lore," lǣran "to teach;" feallan "to fall," fiellan "to fell."
- In the abstract nouns in þ(u) (PGmc *-iþō) corresponding to certain adjectives – e.g., strang "strong," strengþ(u) "strength;" hāl "whole/hale," hǣlþ(u) "health;" fūl "foul," fȳlþ(u) "filth."
- In female forms of several nouns with the suffix -enn (PGmc *-injō) – e.g., god "god," gydenn "goddess" (cf. German Gott, Göttin); fox "fox," fyxenn "vixen."
- In i-stem abstract nouns derived from verbs (PGmc *-iz) – e.g. cyme "a coming," cuman "to come;" byre "a son (orig., a being born)," beran "to bear;" fiell "a falling," feallan "to fall;" bend "a bond," bindan "to bind." Note that in some cases the abstract noun has a different vowel than the corresponding verb, due to Proto-Indo-European ablaut.

===== Notes =====
1. The phonologically expected umlaut of /a/ is /æ/. However, in many cases /e/ appears. Most /a/ in Old English stem from earlier /æ/ because of a change called a-restoration. This change was blocked when /i/ or /j/ followed, leaving /æ/, which subsequently mutated to /e/. For example, in the case of talu "tale" vs. tellan "to tell," the forms at one point in the early history of Old English were *tælu and *tælljan, respectively. A-restoration converted *tælu to talu, but left *tælljan alone, and it subsequently evolved to tellan by i-mutation. The same process "should" have led to *becþ instead of bæcþ. That is, the early forms were *bæcan and *bæciþ. A-restoration converted *bæcan to bacan but left alone *bæciþ, which would normally have evolved by umlaut to *becþ. In this case, however, once a-restoration took effect, *bæciþ was modified to *baciþ by analogy with bacan, and then later umlauted to bæcþ.
2. A similar process resulted in the umlaut of /o/ sometimes appearing as /e/ and sometimes (usually, in fact) as /y/. In Old English, /o/ generally stems from a-mutation of original /u/. A-mutation of /u/ was blocked by a following /i/ or /j/, which later triggered umlaut of the /u/ to /y/, the reason for alternations between /o/ and /y/ being common. Umlaut of /o/ to /e/ occurs only when an original /u/ was modified to /o/ by analogy before umlaut took place. For example, dohtor comes from late Proto-Germanic *dohter, from earlier *duhter. The plural in Proto-Germanic was *duhtriz, with /u/ unaffected by a-mutation due to the following /i/. At some point prior to i-mutation, the form *duhtriz was modified to *dohtriz by analogy with the singular form, which then allowed it to be umlauted to a form that resulted in dehter.

A few hundred years after i-umlaut began, another similar change called double umlaut occurred. It was triggered by an /i/ or /j/ in the third or fourth syllable of a word and mutated all previous vowels but worked only when the vowel directly preceding the /i/ or /j/ was /u/. This /u/ typically appears as ⟨e⟩ in Old English or is deleted:

- hægtess "witch" < PGmc *hagatusjō (cf. Old High German hagazussa)
- ǣmerge "embers" < Pre-OE *āmurja < PGmc *aimurjǭ (cf. Old High German eimurja)
- ǣrende "errand" < PGmc *ǣrundijaz (cf. Old Saxon ārundi)
- efstan "to hasten" < archaic øfestan < Pre-OE *ofustan
- ȳmest "upmost" < PGmc *uhumistaz (cf. Gothic áuhumists)

As shown by the examples, affected words typically had /u/ in the second syllable and /a/ in the first syllable. The /æ/ developed too late to break to ea or to trigger palatalization of a preceding velar.

==== I-mutation in High German ====
I-mutation is visible in Old High German (OHG), c. 800 CE, only on short /a/, which was mutated to /e/ (the so-called "primary umlaut"), although in certain phonological environments the mutation fails to occur. By then, it had already become partly phonologized, since some of the conditioning /i/ and /j/ sounds had been deleted or modified. The later history of German, however, shows that /o/ and /u/, as well as long vowels and diphthongs, and the remaining instances of /a/ that had not been umlauted already, were also affected (the so-called "secondary umlaut"); starting in Middle High German, the remaining conditioning environments disappear and /o/ and /u/ appear as /ø/ and /y/ in the appropriate environments.

That has led to a controversy over when and how i-mutation appeared on these vowels. Some (for example, Herbert Penzl) have suggested that the vowels must have been modified without being indicated for lack of proper symbols and/or because the difference was still partly allophonic. Others (such as Joseph Voyles) have suggested that the i-mutation of /o/ and /u/ was entirely analogical and pointed to the lack of i-mutation of these vowels in certain places where it would be expected, in contrast to the consistent mutation of /a/. Perhaps the answer is somewhere in between — i-mutation of /o/ and /u/ was indeed phonetic, occurring late in OHG, but later spread analogically to the environments where the conditioning had already disappeared by OHG (this is where failure of i-mutation is most likely). It must also be kept in mind that it is an issue of relative chronology: already early in the history of attested OHG, some umlauting factors are known to have disappeared (such as word-internal /j/ after geminates and clusters), and depending on the age of OHG umlaut, that could explain some cases where expected umlaut is missing. The whole question should now be reconsidered in the light of Fausto Cercignani's suggestion that the Old High German umlaut phenomena produced phonemic changes before the factors that triggered them off changed or disappeared, because the umlaut allophones gradually shifted to such a degree that they became distinctive in the phonological system of the language and contrastive at a lexical level.

However, sporadic place-name attestations demonstrate the presence of the secondary umlaut already for the early 9th century, which makes it likely that all types of umlaut were indeed already present in Old High German, even if they were not indicated in the spelling. Presumably, they arose already in the early 8th century. Ottar Grønvik, also in view of spellings of the type ⟨ei⟩, ⟨ui⟩, and ⟨oi⟩ in the early attestations, affirms the old epenthesis theory, which views the origin of the umlaut vowels in the insertion of /j/ after back vowels, not only in West, but also in North Germanic. Fausto Cercignani prefers the assimilation theory and presents a history of the OHG umlauted vowels up to the present day.

In modern German, umlaut as a marker of the plural of nouns is a regular feature of the language, and although umlaut generally is no longer a productive force in German, new plurals of this type can be created by analogy. Likewise, umlaut marks the comparative of many adjectives and other kinds of inflected and derived forms. Borrowed words have acquired umlaut as in Chöre 'choirs' or europäisch 'European.' Umlaut seems to be totally productive in connection with diminutive suffix -chen, as in Skandäl-chen 'little scandal.'

Because of the grammatical importance of such pairs, the German umlaut diacritic was developed, making the phenomenon very visible. The result in German is that the vowels written as ⟨a⟩, ⟨o⟩, and ⟨u⟩ become ⟨ä⟩, ⟨ö⟩, and ⟨ü⟩, and the diphthong ⟨au⟩ /aʊ/ becomes ⟨äu⟩ /ɔʏ/: Mann [man] "man" vs. Männer [ˈmɛnɐ] "men," Fuß [fuːs] "foot" vs. Füße [ˈfyːsə] "feet," Maus [maʊs] "mouse" vs. Mäuse [ˈmɔʏzə] "mice."

In various dialects, the umlaut became even more important as a morphological marker of the plural after the apocope of final schwa (-e); that rounded front vowels have become unrounded in many dialects does not prevent them from serving as markers of the plural given that they remain distinct from their non-umlauted counterparts (just like in English foot – feet, mouse – mice). The example Gast "guest" vs. Gäst(e) "guests" served as the model for analogical pairs like Tag "day" vs. Täg(e) "days" (vs. standard Tage) and Arm "arm" vs. Ärm(e) "arms" (vs. standard Arme). Even plural forms like Fisch(e) "fish," which had never had a front rounded vowel in the first place, were interpreted as such (i.e., as if from Middle High German **füsche) and led to singular forms like Fusch [fʊʃ], which are attested in some dialects.

==== I-mutation in Old Saxon ====
In Old Saxon, umlaut is much less apparent than in Old Norse. In extant texts, the only vowel that is regularly fronted before an /i/ or /j/ is short /a/: gast – gesti, slahan – slehis. Umlaut must have had a greater effect than the orthography shows, however, since all later dialects have a regular umlaut of both long and short vowels, and in many instances the triggering sound had been lost from affected words by the time they came to be written in Old Saxon.

==== I-mutation in Dutch ====
Late Old Dutch saw a merger of /u/ and /o/, causing their umlauted results to merge as well, giving /ʏ/. The lengthening in open syllables in early Middle Dutch then lengthened and lowered this short /ʏ/ to long /øː/ (spelled ⟨eu⟩) in some words. This is parallel to the lowering of /i/ in open syllables to /eː/, as in schip ("ship") – schepen ("ships").

In general, the effects of the Germanic umlaut in plural formation are limited. One of the defining phonological features of Dutch is the general absence of the I-mutation or secondary umlaut when dealing with long vowels. Unlike English and German, Dutch does not palatalize the long vowels, which are notably absent from the language. Thus, for example, where modern German has fühlen /ˈfyːlən/ and English has feel /fiːl/ (from Proto-Germanic *fōlijaną), standard Dutch retains a back vowel in the stem in voelen /ˈvulə(n)/. Thus, only two of the original Germanic vowels were affected by umlaut at all in Dutch: /a/, which became /ɛ/, and /u/, which became /ʏ/ (spelled ⟨u⟩). As a result of this relatively sparse occurrence of umlaut, standard Dutch does not use umlaut as a grammatical marker. An exception is the noun stad "city" which has the irregular umlauted plural steden.

Later developments in Middle Dutch show that long vowels and diphthongs were not affected by umlaut in the more western dialects, including those in western Brabant and Holland that were most influential for standard Dutch. However in what is traditionally called the Cologne Expansion (the spread of certain West German features in the south-easternmost Dutch dialects during the High Medieval period) the more eastern and southeastern dialects of Dutch, including easternmost Brabantian and all of Limburgish have umlaut of long vowels (or in case of Limburgish, all rounded back vowels), however. Consequently, these dialects also make grammatical use of umlaut to form plurals and diminutives, much as most other modern Germanic languages do. Compare vulen /vylə(n)/ and menneke "little man" from man.

=== North Germanic languages ===
Umlaut is a feature of Icelandic, in which both i-umlaut and a-umlaut exist. The situation in Old Norse is complicated as there are two forms of i-mutation. Of these two, only one is phonologized. I-mutation in Old Norse is phonological:

- In Proto-Norse, if the syllable was heavy and followed by vocalic i (*gastiʀ > gestr, but *staði > *stað) or, regardless of syllable weight, if followed by consonantal i (*skunja > skyn). The rule is not perfect, as some light syllables were still umlauted: *kuni > kyn, *komiʀ > kømr.
- In Old Norse, if the following syllable contains a remaining Proto-Norse i. For example, the root of the dative singular of u-stems are i-mutated as the desinence contains a Proto-Norse i, but the dative singular of a-stems is not, as their desinence stems from Proto-Norse ē.

I-mutation is not phonological if the vowel of a long syllable is i-mutated by a syncopated i. I-mutation does not occur in short syllables.

i-mutation
Original	Mutated	Example
a	e (ę)	fagr (fair) / fegrstr (fairest)
au	ey	lauss (loose) / leysa (to loosen)
á	æ	Áss / Æsir
o	ø	koma (to come) / kømr (comes)
ó	œ	róa (to row) / rœr (rows)
u	y	upp (up) / yppa (to lift up)
ú	ý	fúll (foul) / fýla (filth)
jú	ý	ljúga (to lie) / lýgr (lies)
ǫ	ø	sǫkk (sank) / søkkva (to sink)

== See also ==
- Germanic a-mutation
- I-mutation
- Indo-European ablaut
- Umlaut (disambiguation)
- Umlaut (diacritic)

== Sources ==
- Belemans, Rob; Keulen, Ronny (2004). Belgisch-Limburgs. Taal: Lannoo Uitgeverij.
- Campbell, A. (1959). Old English Grammar. Oxford: Clarendon Press. LCCN 59000985. OCLC 316368. OL 6265985M.
- Campbell, Lyle (2004). Historical Linguistics: An Introduction (2nd ed.). Edinburgh University Press.
- Cercignani, Fausto (1980a). "Early 'Umlaut' Phenomena in the Germanic Languages". Language. 56 (1): 126–136. doi:10.2307/412645. JSTOR 412645.
- Cercignani, Fausto (1980b). "Alleged Gothic Umlauts". Indogermanische Forschungen. 85: 207–213.
- Cercignani, Fausto (2022a). "On the Germanic and Old High German distance assimilation changes". Linguistik Online. 116 (4): 41–59. doi:10.13092/lo.116.8889. ISSN 1615-3014.
- Cercignani, Fausto (2022b). "The development of the Old High German umlauted vowels and the reflex of New High German /ɛ:/ in Present Standard German". Linguistik Online. 113 (1): 45–57. doi:10.13092/lo.113.8317. ISSN 1615-3014.
- Curme, George O. (1952). A Grammar of the German Language. New York: Frederick Ungar Publishing Co. ISBN 0879682132. LCCN 53001179. OCLC 322376.
- Duden. Die deutsche Rechtschreibung (21st ed.). Langenscheidt Publishers. 1996. ISBN 3411040114. OCLC 35821057. OL 9027008M.
- "Flickr collection: vertical umlauts". Flickr. Archived from the original on 25 September 2015.
- Grønvik, Ottar (1998). Untersuchungen zur älteren nordischen und germanischen Sprachgeschichte (in German). Frankfurt: Peter Lang. ISBN 3-631-33479-6. LCCN 98211386. OCLC 39702494. OL 483356M.
- Gütter, Adolf (2011). "Frühe Belege für den Umlaut von ahd. /u/, /ō/ und /ū/". Beiträge zur Geschichte der deutschen Sprache und Literatur (in German). 133 (1): 1–13. doi:10.1515/bgsl.2011.002. S2CID 162809692.
- Hansson, Gunnar Ólafur; Wiese, Richard (2024). Ritter, Nancy A.; van der Hulst, Harry (eds.). "Umlaut in the Germanic languages". The Oxford Handbook of Vowel Harmony. Oxford: Oxford University Press: 864–871. doi:10.1093/oxfordhb/9780198826804.013.68. ISBN 978-0-19-882680-4.
- Hardwig, Florian (28 May 2013). "Jazz in Town". Fonts in Use. Archived from the original on 7 November 2020.
- Hardwig, Florian (17 December 2014). "Compact umlaut". Fonts in Use. Archived from the original on 16 July 2015.
- Hardwig, Florian (n.d.). "Unusual Umlauts (German)". Typojournal. Archived from the original on 11 October 2017.
- Hogg, Richard M. (1992). Hogg, Richard M. (ed.). "Phonology and Morphology". The Cambridge History of the English Language. 1, The Beginnings to 1066. Cambridge: Cambridge University Press: 67–167. doi:10.1017/CHOL9780521264747.004. ISBN 978-1-139-05552-9.
- Howell, Robert B.; Salmons, Joseph C. (1997). "Umlautless Residues in Germanic". American Journal of Germanic Linguistics and Literatures. 9: 83–111. doi:10.1017/S1040820700002006.
- Isert, Jörg (June 2007). "Fast Food: McDonald's schafft "Big Mäc" und "Fishmäc" ab" [Fast food: McDonald's abolishes "Big Mäc" and "Fishmäc"]. Welt Online (in German). Axel Springer AG. Archived from the original on 9 March 2012.
- Malmkjær, Kirsten, ed. (2002). The linguistics encyclopedia (2nd ed.). London: Routledge, Taylor & Francis Group. ISBN 0-415-22209-5.
- "Alternate Spelling Conventions". Oracle. Archived from the original on 16 June 2022.
- Paul, Hermann (1966). Mittelhochdeutsche Grammatik. Tübingen: Max Niemeyer Verlag. OCLC 3508912. OL 18435470M.
- Penzl, Herbert (1949). "Umlaut and Secondary Umlaut in Old High German". Language. 25 (3): 223–240. doi:10.2307/410084. JSTOR 410084.
- Ringe, Don (2006). From Proto-Indo-European to Proto-Germanic (PDF). A Linguistic History of English (1st ed.). New York City: Oxford University Press. ISBN 978-0-19-928413-9. OCLC 64554645. OL 7405151M. Wikidata Q131605459.
- Voyles, Joseph (1992). "On Old High German i-umlaut". In Rauch, Irmengard; Carr, Gerald F.; Kyes, Robert L. (eds.). On Germanic Linguistics: Issues and Methods. Trends in Linguistics. Studies and Monographs [TiLSM]. Vol. 68. Berlin: De Gruyter Mouton. pp. 365–394. doi:10.1515/9783110856446.365. ISBN 978-3-11-013000-3.
- Walshe, Maurice O'Connell (1974). A Middle High German Reader With Grammar, Notes and Glossary. Oxford: Clarendon Press. ISBN 0198720785. LCCN 74236601. OCLC 1302153065. OL 5132091M.
- Willemyns, Roland (2013). Dutch: Biography of a Language. OUP USA. ISBN 978-0199858712.
