= U-mutation =

U-mutation, or u-umlaut, can refer to various processes that occurred in the history of some Germanic languages:

- Old Norse u-umlaut, allophones of non-rounded vowels before back rounded vowels being made distinctive around the 8th century
- Icelandic u-umlaut, a similar process affecting only /a/ and operating productively in modern Icelandic
- Old English back mutation, a change that took place in late prehistoric Old English
