= Diaeresis (diacritic) =

Mark that indicates separation of vowels

◌̈o

Diaeresis
- U+0308 ◌̈ COMBINING DIAERESIS

A diaeresis (Note: also spelled diæresis or dieresis; plural: diaereses, etc.) (/daɪˈɛrəsɪs, -ˈɪər-/ dy-ERR-ə-siss, -EER-) is a diacritical mark consisting of two dots (◌̈) that indicates that two adjacent vowel letters are separate syllables – a vowel hiatus (which is also named diaeresis in linguistics terminology) – rather than a digraph or diphthong.

It consists of a two dots diacritic placed over a letter, generally a vowel. (Note: When the letter is an ⟨i⟩, the diacritic replaces the tittle: ⟨ï⟩)

The diaeresis diacritic indicates that two adjoining letters that would normally form a digraph and be pronounced as one sound, are instead to be read as separate vowels in two syllables. For example, in the spelling "coöperate", the diaeresis reminds the reader that the word has four syllables, co-op-er-ate, not three, *coop-er-ate. In British English this usage has been considered obsolete for many years, and in US English, although it persisted for longer, it is now considered archaic as well. Nevertheless, it is still used by the US magazine The New Yorker. In English language texts it is perhaps most familiar in the loan words naïve, Noël and Chloë, and is also used officially in the name of the island Teän and of Coös County. Languages such as Dutch, Afrikaans, Catalan, French, Galician, Greek, and Spanish make regular use of the diaeresis. (In some Germanic and other languages, the umlaut diacritic has the same appearance but a different function.)

== Name ==
The word diaeresis is from Greek diaíresis (διαίρεσις), meaning "division", "separation", or "distinction". The word trema (French: tréma), used in linguistics and also classical scholarship, is from the Greek trē̂ma (τρῆμα) and means a "perforation", "orifice", or "pip" (as on dice), thus describing the form of the diacritic rather than its function.

== History ==
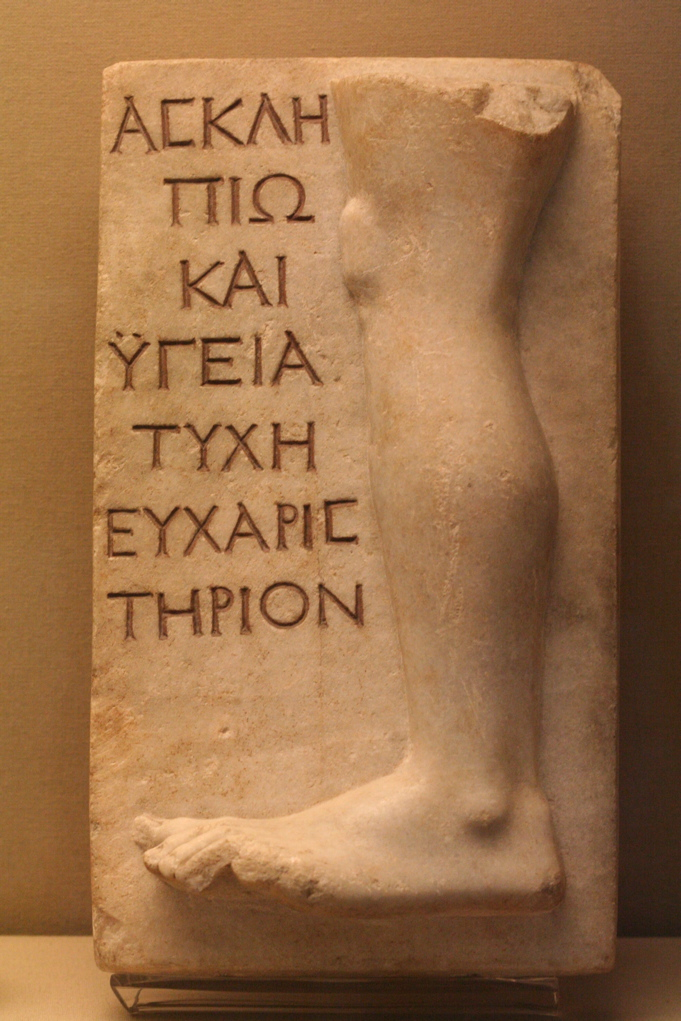
Votive relief, ca. 100–200 AD

In Greek, two dots, called a trema, were used in the Hellenistic period on the letters ι and υ, most often at the beginning of a word, as in ϊδων, ϋιος, and ϋβριν, to separate them from a preceding vowel. This was needed because writing was scriptio continua, where spacing was not yet used as a word divider. However, it was also used to indicate that a vowel formed its own syllable (in phonological hiatus), as in ηϋ and Αϊδι.

The diaeresis was borrowed for this purpose in several languages of western and southern Europe, among them Occitan, Catalan, French, Dutch, Welsh, and (rarely) English. As a further extension, some languages began to use a diaeresis whenever a vowel letter was to be pronounced separately. This included vowels that would otherwise form digraphs with consonants or simply be silent. For example, in the orthographies of Spanish, Catalan, French, Galician and Occitan, the graphemes gu and qu normally represent a single sound, [ɡ] or [k], before the front vowels e and i (or before nearly all vowels in Occitan). In the few exceptions where the u is pronounced, a diaeresis is added to it.

Examples:

- Spanish pingüino [piŋˈɡwino] "penguin"
- Catalan aigües [ˈajɣwəs] "waters", qüestió [kwəstiˈo] "matter, question"
- Occitan lingüista [liŋˈɡwistɔ] "linguist", aqüatic [aˈkwatik] "aquatic"
- French aiguë or aigüe [eɡy] "acute (fem.)"
  Note that the e is silent in most modern accents; without the diacritic, both the e and the u would be silent, or pronounced as a schwa in accents that have conserved all post-consonantal schwas, including in poetry recitation, as in the proper name Aigues-Mortes [ɛɡ(ə)mɔʁt(ə)].
- Galician mingüei [miŋˈɡwej] "I shrank", saïamos "we went out/used to go out"
- Luxembourgish Chance [ˈʃɑ̃ːs] "opportunity", Chancë [ˈʃɑ̃ːsə] (before a consonant) "opportunities"
- Dutch ideeën "ideas"
- Afrikaans hoër "higher"
- Greek γαϊδούρι [ɣai̯ˈðuɾi] "donkey"

This has been extended to Ganda, where a diaeresis separates y from n: anya [aɲa], anÿa [aɲja].

'Ÿ' is sometimes used in transcribed Greek, where it represents the Greek letter υ (upsilon) in hiatus with α. For example, it can be seen in the transcription Artaÿctes of the Persian name Ἀρταΰκτης (Artaüktēs) at the very end of Herodotus, or the name of Mount Taÿgetus on the southern Peloponnesus peninsula, which in modern Greek is spelled Ταΰγετος.

== Modern usage ==
=== Catalan ===
In Catalan, the digraphs ai, ei, oi, au, eu, and iu are normally read as diphthongs. To indicate exceptions to this rule (hiatus), a diaeresis mark is placed on the second vowel: without this the words raïm [rəˈim] ("grape") and diürn [diˈurn] ("diurnal") would be read *[ˈrajm] and *[ˈdiwrn], respectively. Diaeresis also indicates that ü is pronounced [w] in digraphs such as gü and qü when placed before e or i.

=== Dutch ===
In Dutch, spellings such as cliënt are necessary because the digraphs oe and ie normally represent the simple vowels [u] and [i], respectively. However, hyphenation is now preferred for compound words so that zeeëend (sea duck) is now spelled zee-eend.

=== English ===
In Modern English, the diaeresis, the grave accent and the acute accent are the only diacritics used apart from loanwords. It may be used optionally for words that do not have a morphological break at the diaeresis point, such as "naïve", "Boötes", and "Noël". It was previously used in words such as "coöperate" and "reënter": in such cases, the diaeresis has been replaced by the use of a hyphen ("co-operate", "re-enter"), particularly in British English, or by no indication at all ("cooperate", "reenter"), as in American English. The use of the diaeresis persists in a few publications, notably The New Yorker and MIT Technology Review under Jason Pontin. The diaeresis mark is sometimes used in English personal first and last names to indicate that two adjacent vowels should be pronounced separately, rather than as a diphthong. Examples include the given names Chloë and Zoë, which otherwise might be pronounced with a silent e. To discourage a similar mispronunciation, the mark is also used in the surname Brontë. (See also Umlaut (diacritic) § Use of the umlaut for special effect.)

=== French ===
In French, the diaeresis is referred to as a tréma. Some diphthongs that were written with pairs of vowel letters were later reduced to monophthongs, which led to an extension of the value of this diacritic. It often now indicates that the second vowel letter is to be pronounced separately from the first, rather than merge with it into a single sound. For example, the French words maïs [ma.is] and naïve [na.iv] would be pronounced *[mɛ] and *[nɛv], respectively, without the diaeresis mark, since the digraph ai is pronounced [ɛ]. (Note: The word mais with no diaeresis is the conjunction "but" but maïs with one is the cereal "maize" (usually called corn in America) so the distinction is important.) The English spelling of Noël meaning "Christmas" (French: Noël [nɔ.ɛl]) comes from this use. Ÿ occurs in French as a variant of ï in a few proper nouns, as in the name of the Parisian suburb of L'Haÿ-les-Roses [la.i le ʁoz] and in the surname of the house of Croÿ [kʁu.i]. In some names, a diaeresis is used to indicate two vowels historically in hiatus, although the second vowel has since fallen silent, as in Saint-Saëns [sɛ̃sɑ̃s] and de Staël [də stal].

The diaeresis is also used in French when a silent e is added to the sequence gu, to show that it is to be pronounced [ɡy] rather than as a digraph for [ɡ]. For example, when the feminine ‑e is added to aigu [eɡy] "sharp", the pronunciation does not change in most accents: (Note: In some varieties, such as Belgian and Swiss French, "silent" ‑e causes a lengthening of the preceding vowel, so ‑guë/‑güe is pronounced [ɡyː] in those accents.) aiguë [eɡy] as opposed to the city name Aigues-Mortes [ɛɡ mɔʁt]. Similar is the feminine noun ciguë [siɡy] "hemlock"; compare figue [fiɡ] "fig". In the ongoing French spelling reform of 1990, this was moved to the u (aigüe, cigüe). (In canoë [kanɔ.e] the e is not silent, and so is not affected by the spelling reform.)

=== Galician ===
In Galician, diaeresis is employed to indicate hiatus in the first and second persons of the plural of the imperfect tense of verbs ended in -aer, -oer, -aír and -oír (saïamos, caïades). This stems from the fact that an unstressed -i- is left between vowels, but constituting its own syllable, which would end with a form identical in writing but different in pronunciation with those of the Present subjunctive (saiamos, caiades), as those have said i forming a diphthong with the following a.

In addition, identically to Spanish, the diaeresis is used to differentiate the syllables güe [ɡwe] and güi [ɡwi] from gue [ɡe] and gui [ɡi].

=== German ===
In German, in addition to the pervasive use of umlaut diacritics with vowels, diaeresis above ⟨e⟩ occurs in a few proper names, such as Ferdinand Piëch and Bernhard Hoëcker (in which it denotes a vowel hiatus, not a sound shift that an umlaut would indicate. The same typographical mark is used for both usages.)

=== Greek ===
In Modern Greek, the diaeresis is used above iota and upsilon to show that they do not form a digraph (except for ηυ which is never needed) with the preceding vowel (αι, οι, ει, υι, ου, αυ, ευ). For example, αϊ and οϊ represent the diphthongs /ai̯/ and /oi̯/, and εϊ the disyllabic sequence /e.i/, whereas αι, οι, and ει transcribe the simple vowels /e/, /i/, and /i/. The diacritic can be the only one on a vowel (ϊ, ϋ), as in ακαδημαϊκός (akadimaïkós, "academic"), or in combination with an acute accent (ΐ, ΰ), as in πρωτεΐνη (proteïni, "protein").

=== Occitan ===
The Occitan use of diaeresis is very similar to that of Catalan: ai, ei, oi, au, eu, ou are diphthongs consisting of one syllable but aï, eï, oï, aü, eü, oü are groups consisting of two distinct syllables. Diaeresis may be used to indicate that ü is pronounced [w] in digraphs such as gü and qü.

=== Portuguese ===
In Portuguese, a diaeresis (Portuguese: trema) was used in (mainly Brazilian) Portuguese until the 1990 Orthographic Agreement. It was used in combinations güe/qüe and güi/qüi, in words like sangüíneo [sɐ̃ˈɡwinju] "sanguineous". After the implementation of the Orthographic Agreement, it was abolished altogether from all Portuguese words.

=== Spanish ===
Spanish uses the diaeresis obligatorily in words such as cigüeña and pingüino; and optionally in some poetic (or, until 1950, academic) contexts in words like vïuda, and süave.

=== Welsh ===
In Welsh, where the diaeresis appears, it is usually on the stressed vowel, and this is most often on the first of the two adjacent vowels; typical examples are copïo [kɔ.ˈpi.ɔ] (to copy) contrasted with mopio [ˈmɔ.pjɔ] (to mop). It is also used on the first of two vowels that would otherwise form a diphthong (crëir [ˈkreː.ɪr] ('created') rather than creir [ˈkrəi̯r] ('believed')) and on the first of three vowels to separate it from a following diphthong: crëwyd is pronounced [ˈkreː.ʊi̯d] rather than [ˈkrɛu̯.ɨd].

== See also ==
- Two dots (disambiguation)
- Umlaut (disambiguation)
