= Fraktur =

Blackletter typeface

Latin script (Fraktur hand)
- Script type: Alphabet
- Period: 16th century – 1941
- Direction: Left-to-right
- Languages: German and some other European languages

Related scripts
- Parent systems: Blackletter: Latin script (Fraktur hand)
- Child systems: Kurrentschrift, including Sütterlin
- Sister systems: See Blackletter

ISO 15924
- ISO 15924: Latf (217), Latin (Fraktur variant)

Unicode
- Unicode range: 0020–00FF (Note: normal Latin range; see below)

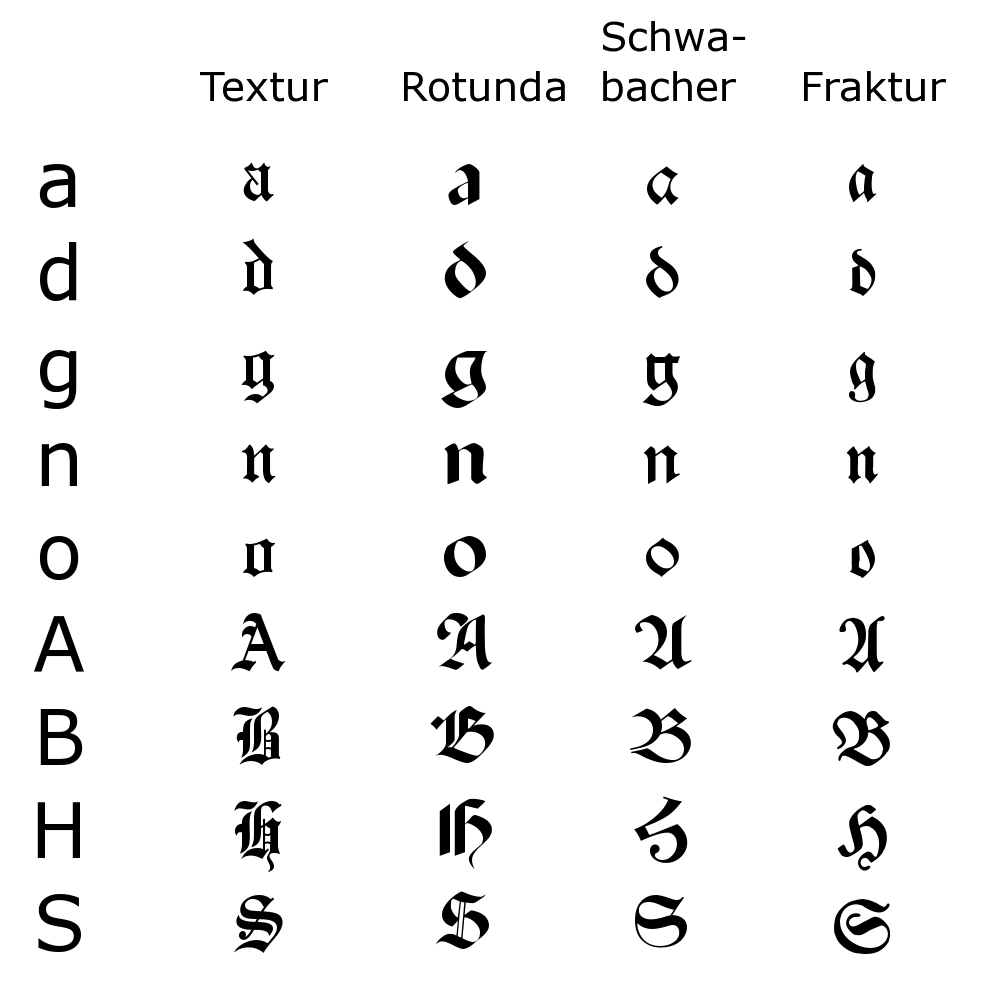
A modern sans-serif and four blackletter typefaces (left to right): Textur(a), Rotunda, Schwabacher and Fraktur.

Fraktur (German: [fʁakˈtuːɐ̯]) is a book hand of the Latin alphabet and any of several blackletter typefaces derived from this hand. It is designed such that the beginnings and ends of the individual strokes that make up each letter will be clearly visible, and often emphasized; in this way it is often contrasted with the curves of the Antiqua (common) typefaces where the letters are designed to flow and strokes connect together in a continuous fashion. The word "Fraktur" derives from Latin frāctūra ("a break"), built from frāctus, passive participle of frangere ("to break"), which is also the root for the English word "fracture". In non-professional contexts, the term "Fraktur" is sometimes misused to refer to all blackletter typefaces – while Fraktur typefaces do fall under that category, not all blackletter typefaces exhibit the Fraktur characteristics described above. (Note: Similarly, the term "Gothic" is sometimes also incorrectly used to refer to Fraktur typefaces. However, in typography, the term "Gothic" simply means sans-serif.)

Fraktur is often characterized as "the German typeface", as it remained popular in Germany and much of Eastern Europe far longer than elsewhere. Beginning in the 19th century, the use of Fraktur versus Antiqua (seen as modern) was the subject of controversy in Germany. The Antiqua–Fraktur dispute continued until 1941, when the Nazi government banned Fraktur typefaces; they remain in limited use today.

== Characteristics ==
Besides the 26 letters of the ISO basic Latin alphabet, (Note: ISO basic Latin alphabet is derived from the English alphabet hence its 26 letters.) Fraktur usually includes the Eszett ⟨ß⟩ in the ⟨ſʒ⟩ form, vowels with umlauts, and the long s ⟨ſ⟩. Some Fraktur typefaces also include a variant form of the letter r known as the r rotunda, and many include a variety of ligatures which are left over from cursive handwriting and have rules for their use. Most older Fraktur typefaces make no distinction between the majuscules ⟨I⟩ and ⟨J⟩ (where the common shape is more suggestive of a ⟨J⟩), even though the minuscules ⟨i⟩ and ⟨j⟩ are differentiated.

One difference between the Fraktur and other blackletter scripts is that in the lower case ⟨o⟩, the left part of the bow is broken, but the right part is not. In Danish texts composed in Fraktur, the letter ⟨ø⟩ was already preferred to the German and Swedish ⟨ö⟩ in the 16th century. (Note: Compare, for example, Bibla: Det er den gantske Hellige Scrifft: udsæt paa Danske. 1550. (in Danish) and Biblia: Det er Den gantske Hellige Scrifft paa Danske igien offuerseet oc prentet effter vor allernaadigste herris oc Kongis K. Christian den IV. Befaling. 1633. (in Danish))

In the Latvian variant of Fraktur, used mainly until the 1920s, there are additional characters used to denote Latvian letters with diacritical marks. Stroked letters ⟨Ꞡ ꞡ⟩, ⟨Ꞣ ꞣ⟩, ⟨Ł ł⟩, ⟨Ꞥ ꞥ⟩, ⟨Ꞧ ꞧ⟩ are used for palatalized consonants (⟨Ģ ģ⟩, ⟨Ķ ķ⟩, ⟨Ļ ļ⟩, ⟨Ņ ņ⟩, ⟨Ŗ ŗ⟩), stroked variants of ⟨s⟩ and ⟨ſ⟩ distinguish voiced and unvoiced sibilants or affricates (⟨S ſ⟩ for voiced [z], ⟨Ꞩ ẜ⟩ for unvoiced [s], ⟨ſch⟩ [ž] / ⟨ẜch⟩ [š], ⟨dſch⟩ [dž] / ⟨tẜch⟩ [č]), while accents (⟨à⟩, ⟨â⟩, ⟨ê⟩, ⟨î⟩, ⟨ô⟩, ⟨û⟩) together with digraphs (⟨ah⟩, ⟨eh⟩ etc.) are used for long vowels (⟨Ā ā⟩, ⟨Ē ē⟩, ⟨Ī ī⟩, ⟨Ō ō⟩, ⟨Ū ū⟩). Stroked variants of ⟨s⟩ are also used in pre-1950 Sorbian orthography.

== Origin ==
The first Fraktur typeface arose in the early 16th century, when Emperor Maximilian I commissioned the design of the Triumphal Arch woodcut by Albrecht Dürer and had a new typeface created specifically for this purpose, designed by Hieronymus Andreae. Fraktur types for printing were established by the Augsburg publisher Johann Schönsperger at the issuance of a series of Maximilian's works such as his Prayer Book (Gebetbuch, 1513) or the illustrated Theuerdank poem (1517).

Fraktur quickly overtook the earlier Schwabacher and Textualis typefaces in popularity, and a wide variety of Fraktur fonts were carved and became common in the German-speaking world and areas under German influence (Scandinavia, Estonia, Latvia, Central Europe). In the 18th century, the German Theuerdank Fraktur was further developed by the Leipzig typographer Johann Gottlob Immanuel Breitkopf to create the typeset Breitkopf Fraktur. While over the succeeding centuries, most Central Europeans switched to Antiqua, German speakers remained a notable holdout.

== Use ==
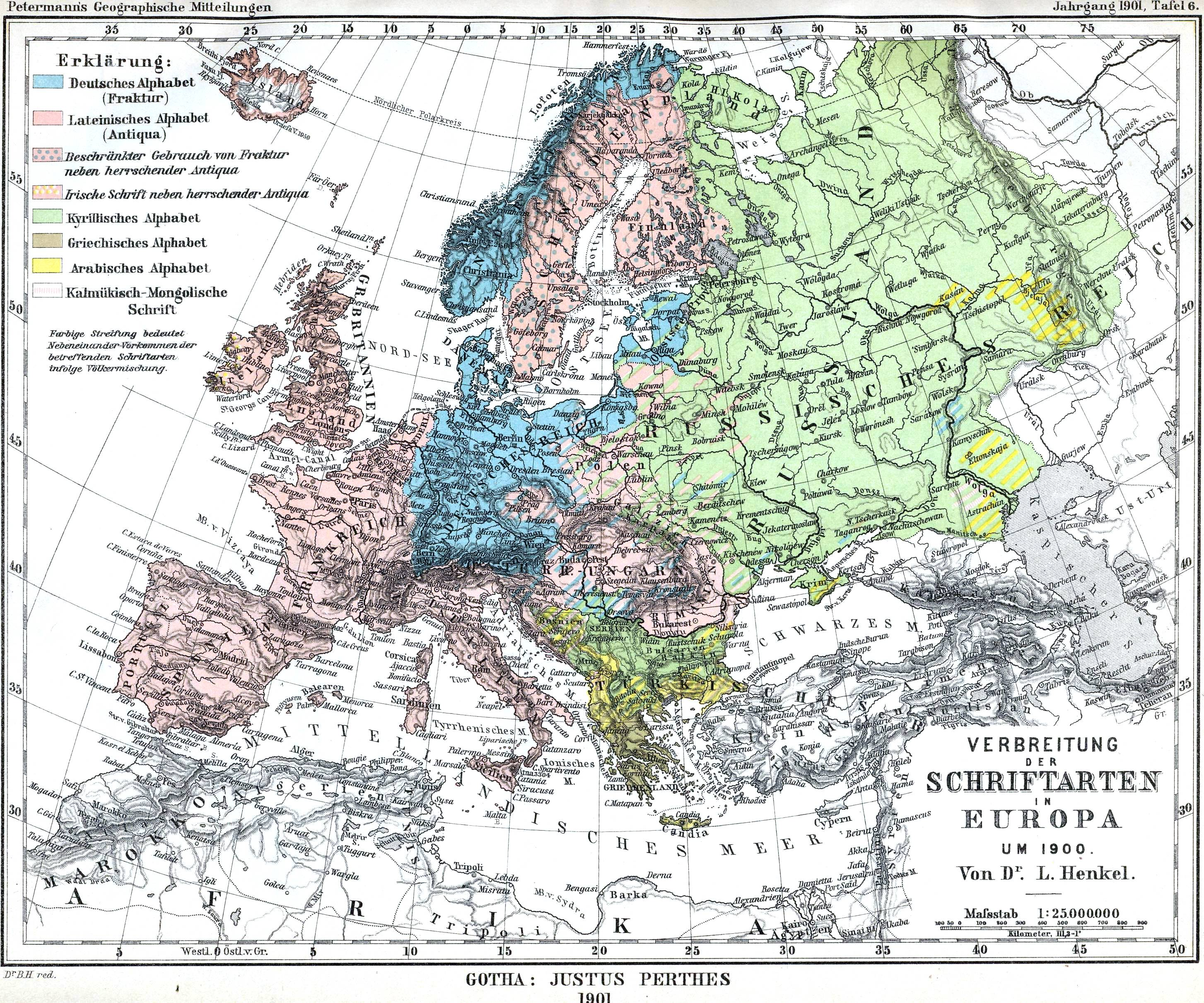
Usage map: A map presenting the contemporary German view of the extent of scripts around 1900. In reality only German-speakers, Estonia, and Latvia still used Fraktur as the majority script at this time. Denmark had shifted to Antiqua during the mid 19th century, and in Norway the majority of printed texts used Antiqua around 1900. Notably, the map itself uses Antiqua for its legend, even though it is in German, indicating that Fraktur was no longer universally used even among German-speakers.

Typesetting in Fraktur was still very common in the early 20th century in all German-speaking countries and areas, as well as in Norway, Estonia, and Latvia, and was still used to a very small extent in Sweden, Finland and Denmark, (Note: In Denmark in 1902 the percentage of printed material using antiqua amounted to 95% according to R. Paulli.) even though other countries typeset in Antiqua. Some books at that time used related blackletter fonts such as Schwabacher; however, the predominant typeface was the Normalfraktur, which came in slight variations.

From the late 18th century to the late 19th century, Fraktur was progressively replaced by Antiqua as a symbol of the classicist age and emerging cosmopolitanism in most of the countries in Europe that had previously used Fraktur. This move was hotly debated in Germany, a controversy known as the Antiqua–Fraktur dispute. The shift affected mostly scientific writing in Germany, whereas most belletristic literature and newspapers continued to be printed in Fraktur.

The Fraktur typefaces remained in use in Nazi Germany, when they were initially represented as true German script; official Nazi documents and letterheads employed the font, and the cover of Hitler's Mein Kampf used a hand-drawn version of it. However, more modernized fonts of the Gebrochene Grotesk type – such as Tannenberg – were in fact the most popular typefaces in Nazi Germany, especially for running text as opposed to decorative uses such as in titles. These fonts were designed in the early 20th century, mainly the 1930s, as grotesque versions of blackletter typefaces. The Nazis heavily used these fonts themselves, although the shift remained controversial; in fact, the press was at times scolded for its frequent use of "Roman characters" under "Jewish influence" and German émigrés were urged to use only "German script". On 3 January 1941, the Nazi Party ended this controversy by switching to international scripts such as Antiqua. Martin Bormann issued a circular (the "normal type decree") to all public offices which declared Fraktur (and its corollary, the Sütterlin-based handwriting) to be Judenlettern (Jewish letters) and prohibited their further use. German historian Albert Kapr has speculated that the regime viewed Fraktur as inhibiting communication in the occupied territories during World War II.

After Nazi Germany fell in 1945, Fraktur was unbanned, but remains in limited use to this day.

== Letter samples ==

In the figures below, the German sentence that appears after the names of the fonts (Walbaum-Fraktur in Fig. 1 and Humboldtfraktur in Fig. 2) reads, Victor jagt zwölf Boxkämpfer quer über den Sylter Deich. It means "Victor chases twelve boxers across the Sylt dike" and contains all 26 letters of the alphabet plus the umlauted glyphs used in German, making it an example of a pangram.

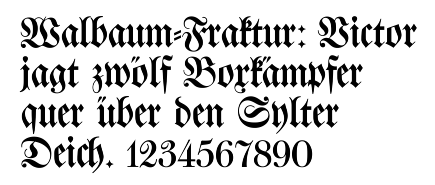
Fig. 1. Walbaum-Fraktur (1800)

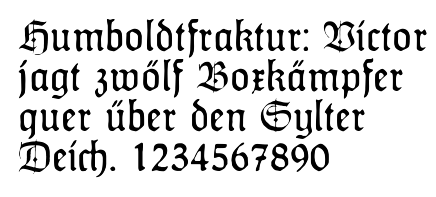
Fig. 2. Humboldtfraktur (Hiero Rhode, 1938)

== Unicode ==
Unicode does not encode Fraktur as a separate script. Instead, Fraktur is considered a "presentation form" of the Latin alphabet. (Note: For examples of more obvious "presentation forms", see display typeface.) Thus, the additional ligatures that are required for Fraktur typefaces will not be encoded in Unicode: support for these ligatures is a font engineering issue left up to font developers.

There are, however, two sets of Fraktur symbols in the Unicode blocks of Mathematical Alphanumeric Symbols, Letterlike Symbols, and Latin Extended-E. The long s, ß, and the umlauted vowels are not encoded, as the characters are specified for use in mathematics and phonetics and are not used to typeset German-language texts. (Note: If a newly created text were required to be printed or displayed in a fraktur style, it would be written using the conventional Latin character set and then rendered using a fraktur computer font, readily available from commercial sources.)

𝔄 𝔅 ℭ 𝔇 𝔈 𝔉 𝔊 ℌ ℑ 𝔍 𝔎 𝔏 𝔐 𝔑 𝔒 𝔓 𝔔 ℜ 𝔖 𝔗 𝔘 𝔙 𝔚 𝔛 𝔜 ℨ
𝔞 𝔟 𝔠 𝔡 𝔢 𝔣 𝔤 𝔥 𝔦 𝔧 𝔨 𝔩 𝔪 𝔫 𝔬 𝔭 𝔮 𝔯 𝔰 𝔱 𝔲 𝔳 𝔴 𝔵 𝔶 𝔷
𝕬 𝕭 𝕮 𝕯 𝕰 𝕱 𝕲 𝕳 𝕴 𝕵 𝕶 𝕷 𝕸 𝕹 𝕺 𝕻 𝕼 𝕽 𝕾 𝕿 𝖀 𝖁 𝖂 𝖃 𝖄 𝖅
𝖆 𝖇 𝖈 𝖉 𝖊 𝖋 𝖌 𝖍 𝖎 𝖏 𝖐 𝖑 𝖒 𝖓 𝖔 𝖕 𝖖 𝖗 𝖘 𝖙 𝖚 𝖛 𝖜 𝖝 𝖞 𝖟

== LaTeX ==
Modern LaTeX implementations (XeTeX, LuaTeX) can use a Fraktur font the usual way using the fontspec package.

For traditional implementations (pdfTeX and older), the \mathfrak{◌} command defined in the amssymb, amsfonts or eufrak package is available. This command does not use Unicode to typeset letters in fraktur: it has its own method.

For example, \mathfrak{Fraktur} produces $\mathfrak{Fraktur}$. Or, in a real example,

Given ideals $\mathfrak{a}, \mathfrak{b}$ of a commutative ring R, the R-annihilator of $(\mathfrak{b} + \mathfrak{a})/\mathfrak{a}$ is an ideal of R called the ideal quotient of $\mathfrak{a}$ by $\mathfrak{b}$ and is denoted by $(\mathfrak{a} : \mathfrak{b})$; it is an instance of idealizer in commutative algebra.

— Ideal (ring theory)

== Gallery ==
Page samples
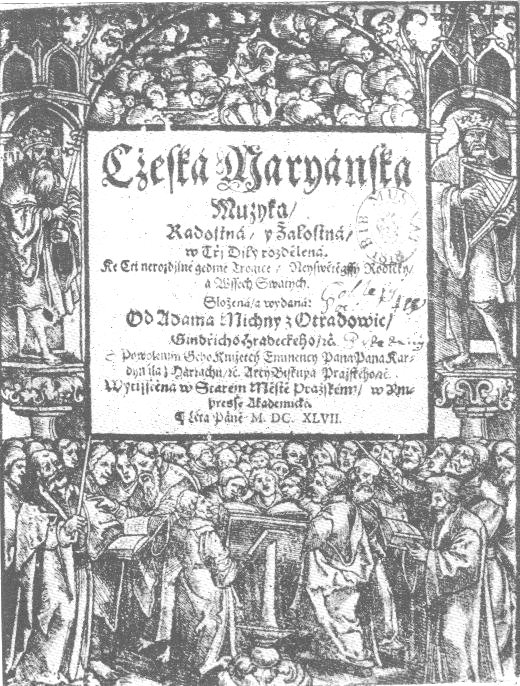
A Czech example of Fraktur: Title page of Česká mariánská muzika by Adam Václav Michna z Otradovic (1647) ("Cżeská maryánska muzyka" by old orthography)

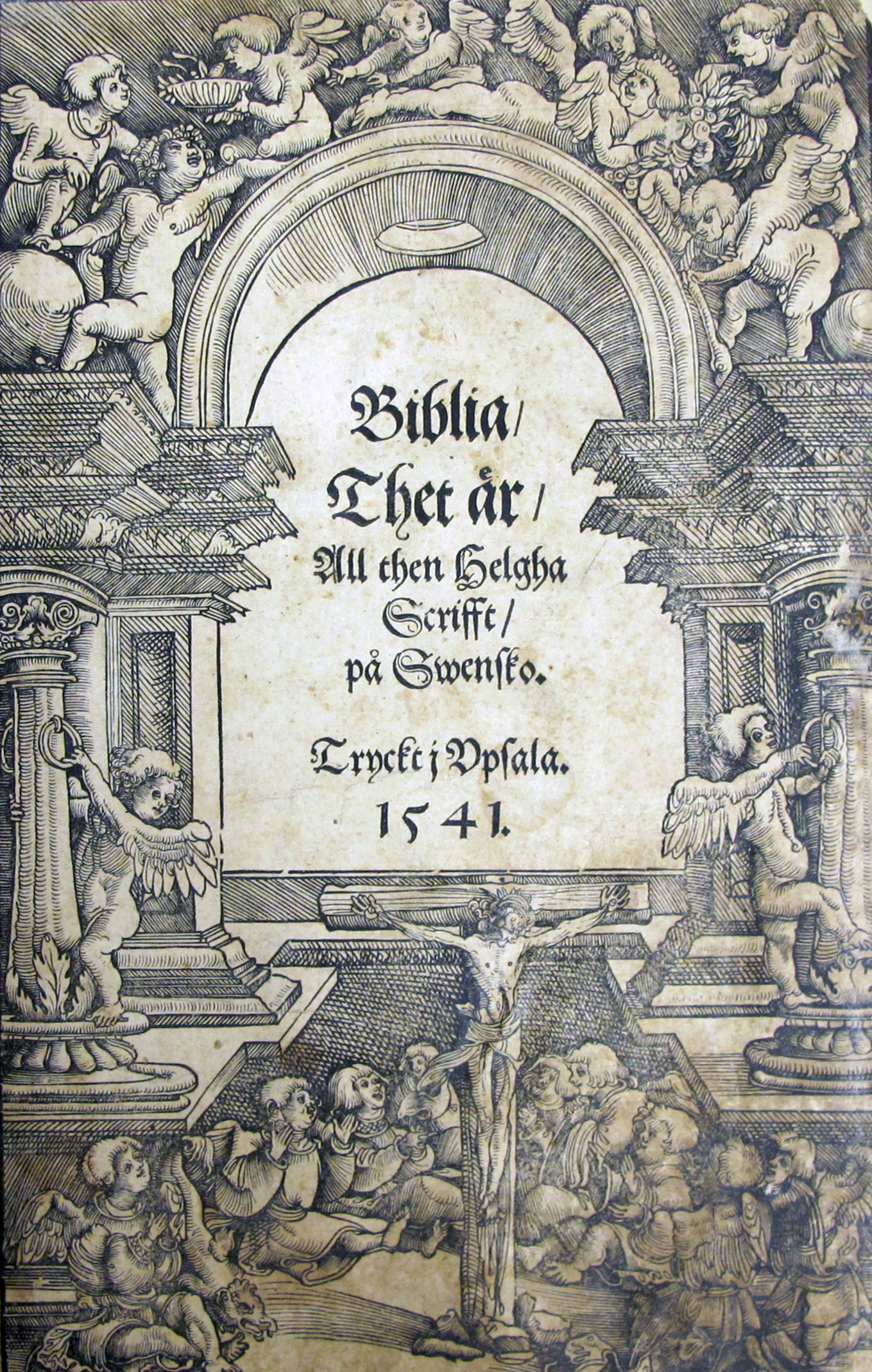
Front page of Gustav Vasa's Bible from 1541, printed using Fraktur

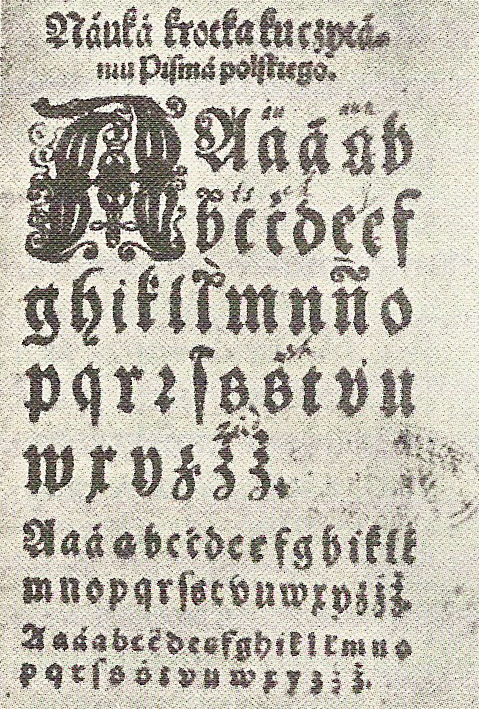
Polish alphabet, 16th century

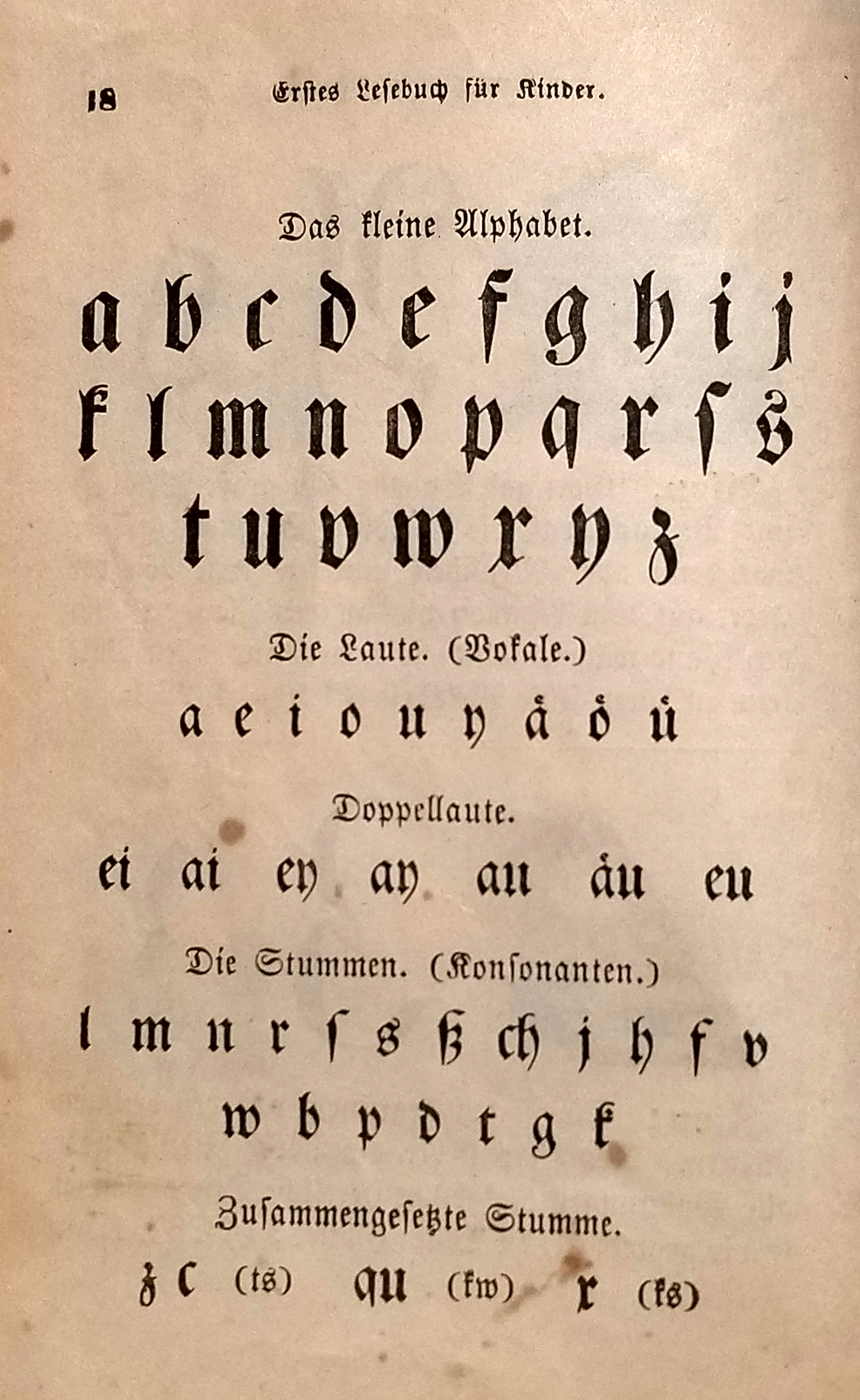
German alphabet from an 1850s American Mennonite children's book

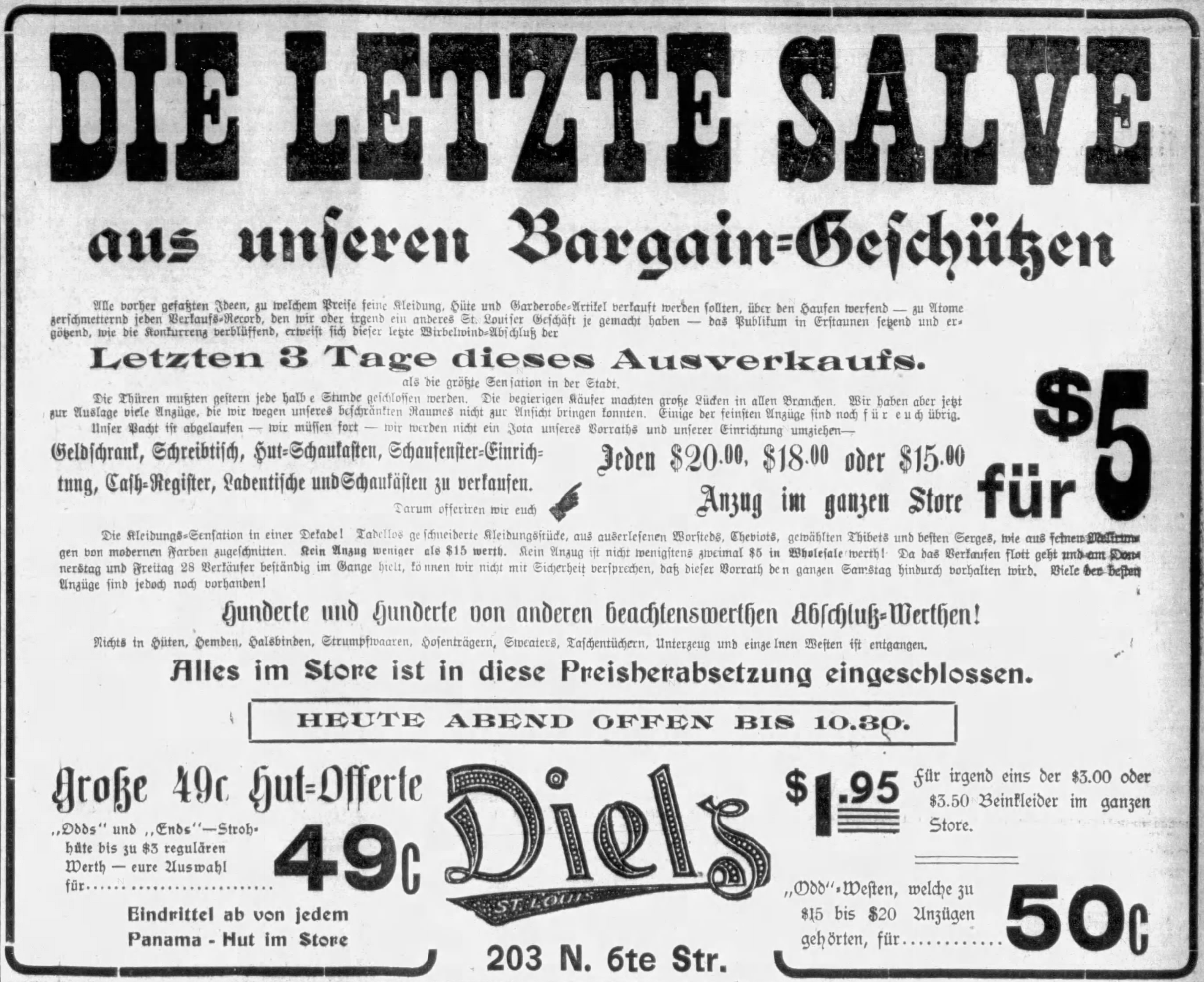
Use in a German-speaking newspaper, the Westliche Post, in Missouri in 1906

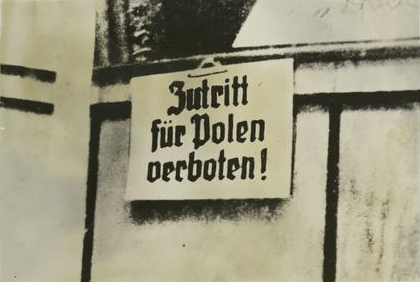
Anti-Polish German notice in German-occupied Poland, 1939: "No entry for Poles!" written with fraktur (German: Zutritt für Polen verboten!)

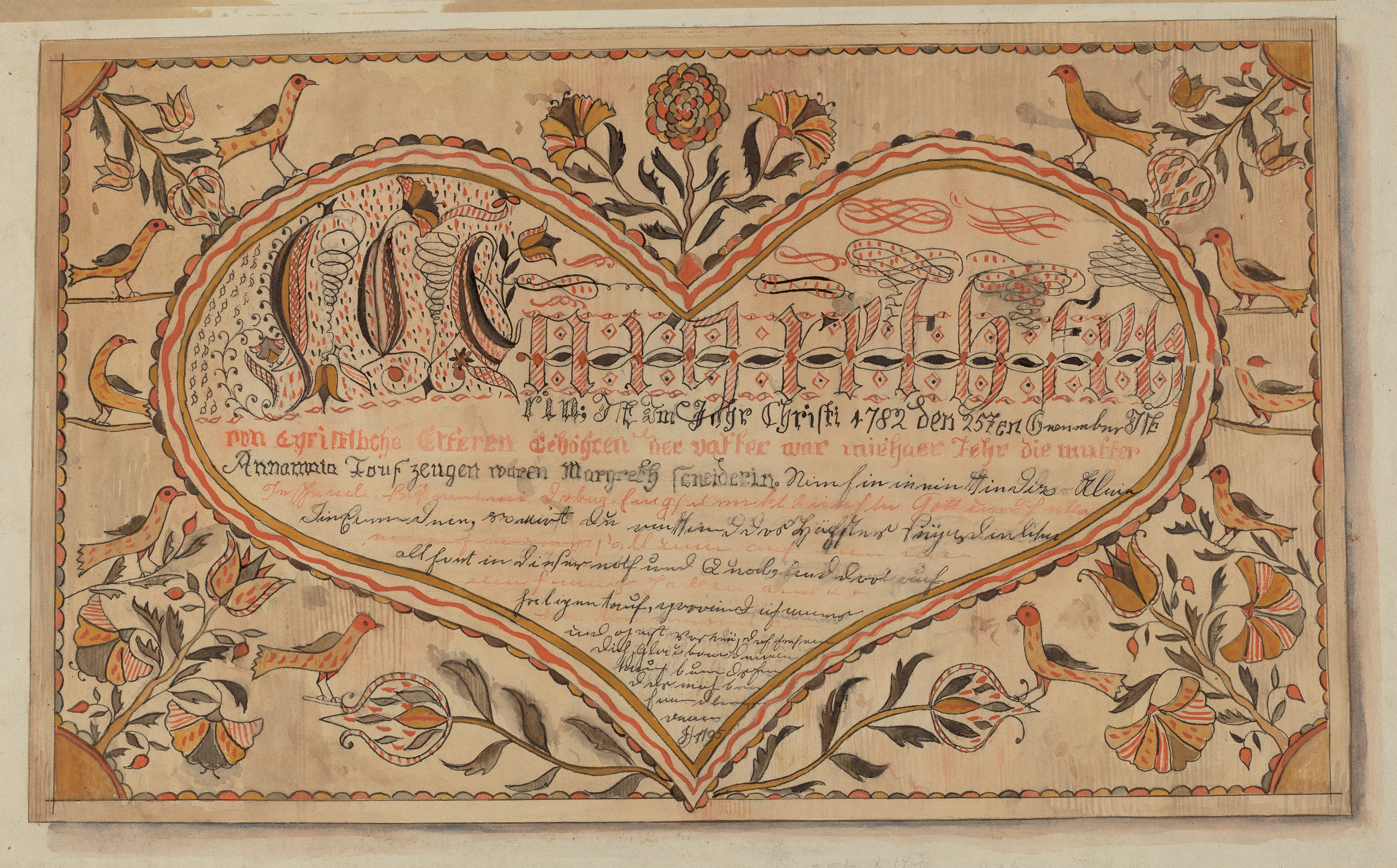
Christening certificate, c. 1936, for Ella Josephine Sterling, written using Fraktur - from the Index of American Design National Gallery of Art

== See also ==
- Breitkopf Fraktur – Blackletter typeface designed 1750
- Fette Fraktur – Typeface designed by Bauer in 1850
- Fraktur (folk art) – Illuminated folk art from Pennsylvania
- Kurrent – Form of German-language handwriting
- Mathematical Alphanumeric Symbols – Unicode block U+1D400 until U+1D7FF
- Sütterlin – Historical form of German handwriting, used 1915–1970s
