= Breitkopf =

Breitkopf may refer to:

- Bernhard Christoph Breitkopf, (1695-1777) founder of Breitkopf & Härtel
- Johann Gottlob Immanuel Breitkopf, (1719-1794) son of Bernhard Cristoph Breitkopf
- Michael Breitkopf, member of German band Die Toten Hosen
- Breitkopf & Härtel, a German music publishing house
