= Sütterlin =

Historical form of German handwriting, used 1915–1970s

Latin script (Sütterlin subvariant)
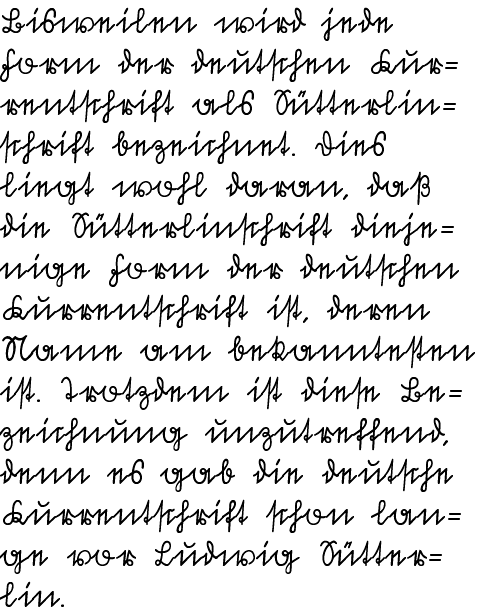
- Sample of Sütterlin (Note: "Bisweilen wird jede Form der deutschen Kurrentschrift als Sütterlinschrift bezeichnet. Dies liegt wohl daran, daß die Sütterlinschrift diejenige Form der deutschen Kurrentschrift ist, deren Namen am bekanntesten ist. Trotzdem ist diese Bezeichnung unzutreffend, denn es gab die deutsche Kurrentschrift schon lange vor Ludwig Sütterlin.")
- Script type: Alphabet
- Period: 1915–1970s
- Direction: Left-to-right
- Languages: German

Related scripts
- Parent systems: Latin script (Blackletter variant): Latin script (Fraktur variant); Latin (Kurrent subvariant); Latin script (Sütterlin subvariant)

ISO 15924
- ISO 15924: Latf (217), Latin (Fraktur variant)

Sütterlinschrift (German pronunciation: [ˈzʏtɐliːnˌʃʁɪft], 'Sütterlin script') is the last widely used form of Kurrent, the historical form of German handwriting script that evolved alongside German blackletter (most notably Fraktur) typefaces. Graphic artist Ludwig Sütterlin was commissioned by the Prussian Ministry of Science, Art and Education (Preußisches Ministerium für Wissenschaft, Kunst und Volksbildung) to create a modern handwriting script in 1911. His handwriting scheme gradually replaced the older cursive scripts that had developed in the 16th century at the same time that letters in books had developed into Fraktur. The name Sütterlin is often used to refer to several similar varieties of old German handwriting, but Sütterlin's own script was taught only from 1915 to 1941 in all German schools.

== History ==
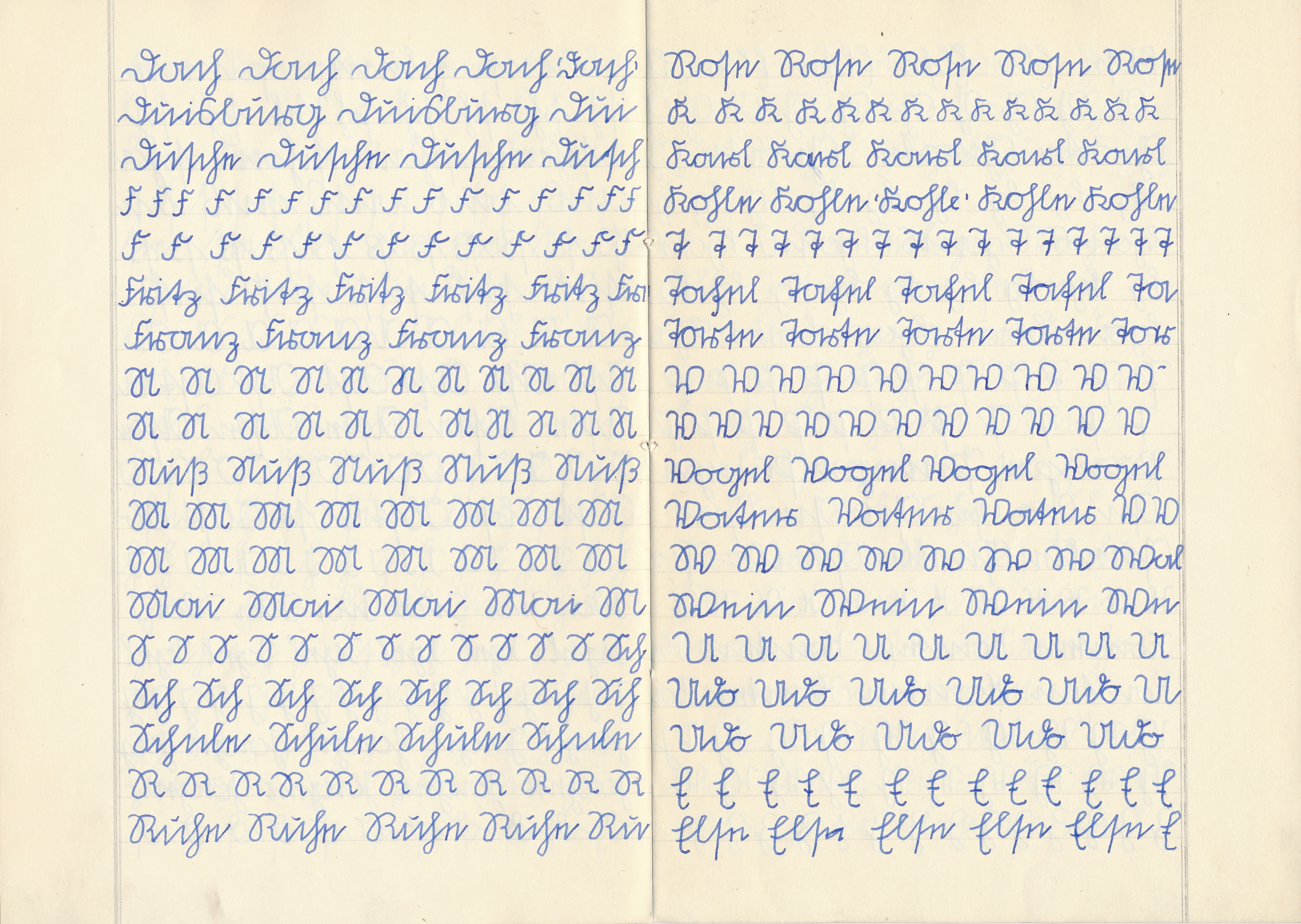
First exercises in Sütterlin in a school notebook (1953)

The ministry had asked for "modern" handwriting scripts to be used in offices and to be taught in school. Sütterlin created two scripts in parallel with the two typefaces that were in use (see Antiqua–Fraktur dispute). The Sütterlin scripts were introduced in Prussia in 1915, and from the 1920s onwards, they began to replace the relatively similar old German handwriting (Kurrent) in schools. In 1935, the Sütterlin style officially became the only German script taught in schools.

In 1941, the Nazi Party banned all "broken" (fraktur, blackletter) typefaces, including Sütterlin, and replaced them with Italian-style lettering, such as the Antiqua typeface class. From the academic year 1941/42 onwards, only the so-called Normalschrift ("normal script"), which had hitherto been taught alongside Sütterlin under the name of "Latin script", was allowed to be used and taught. However, many German speakers who had been brought up with that writing system continued to use it well into the postwar period.

The reading of Sütterlin continued to be taught in some German schools until the 1970s.

== Characteristics ==
Sütterlin is based on older German handwriting, which is a handwriting form of the Blackletter scripts such as Fraktur and Schwabacher, the German print scripts used at the same time.

It includes the long s (ſ) as well as several standard ligatures such as ﬀ (f-f), ﬅ (ſ-t), ﬆ (s-t), and ß (ſ-z or ſ-s).

Because of their distinctiveness, Sütterlin letters can be used on the blackboard for certain mathematical symbols that are represented by Fraktur letters in print. The lower-case d in Kurrent and Sütterlin is used in proofreading for deleatur ("let it be deleted").

The Sütterlin lower-case 'e' contains two vertical bars close together, in which the origin of the umlaut diacritic (¨) from a small 'e' written above the modified vowel can be seen.

== Overview of the letters ==
(There are two lower-case forms of the letter "s". The second one is used at the end of a syllable.)

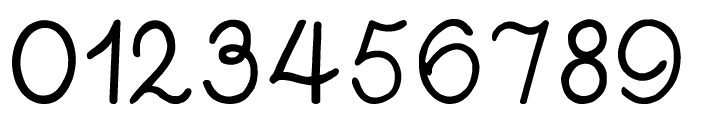

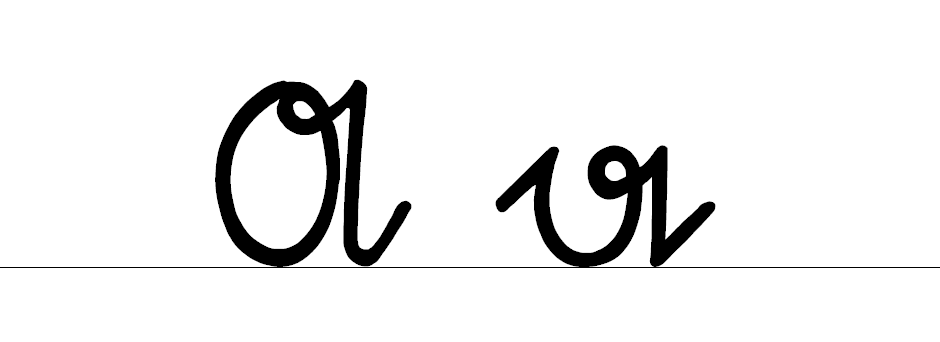

A a

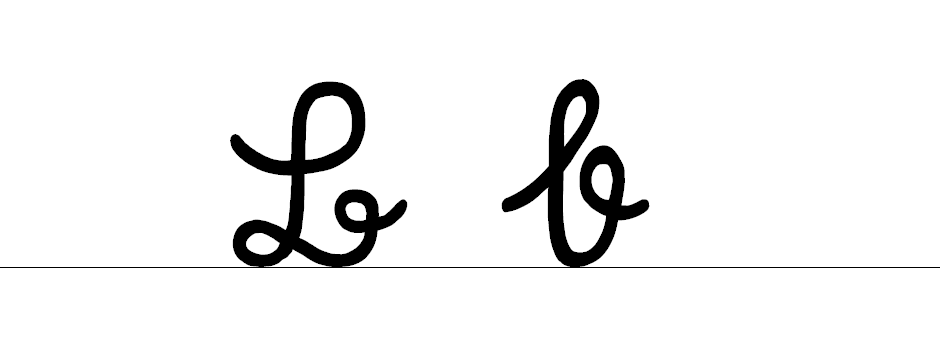

B b

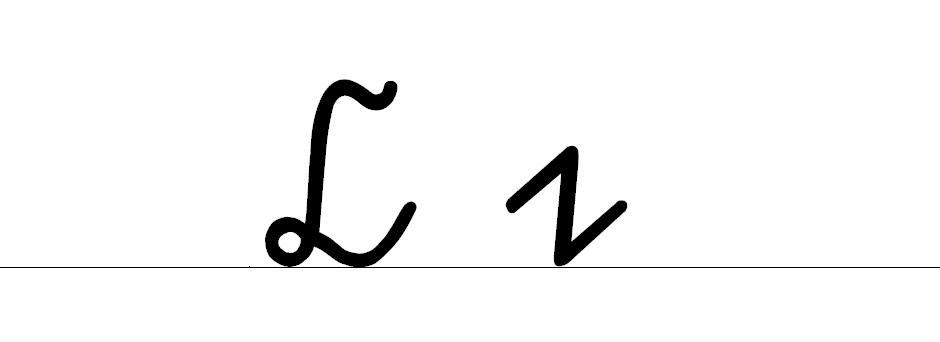

C c

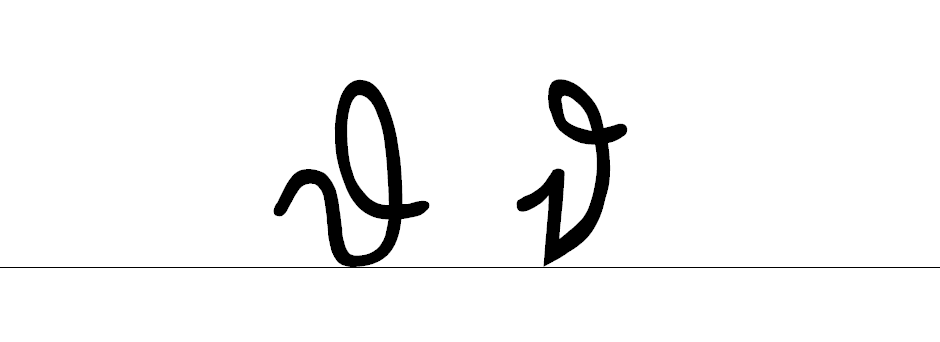

D d

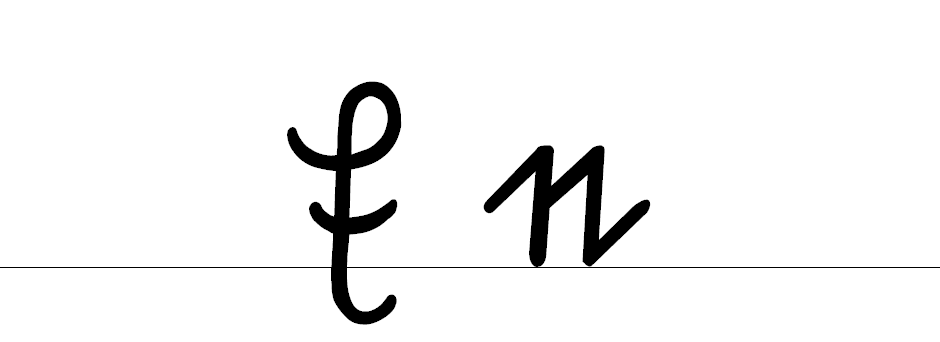

E e

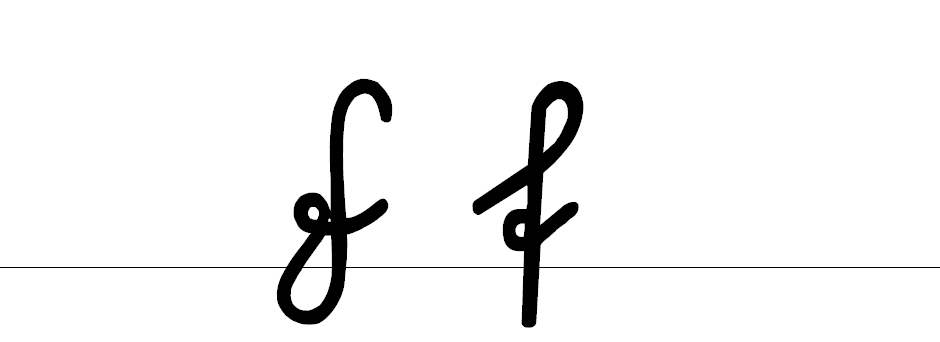

F f

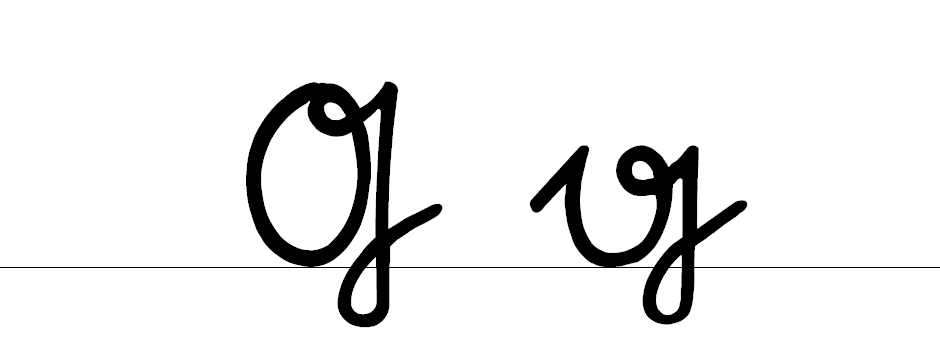

G g

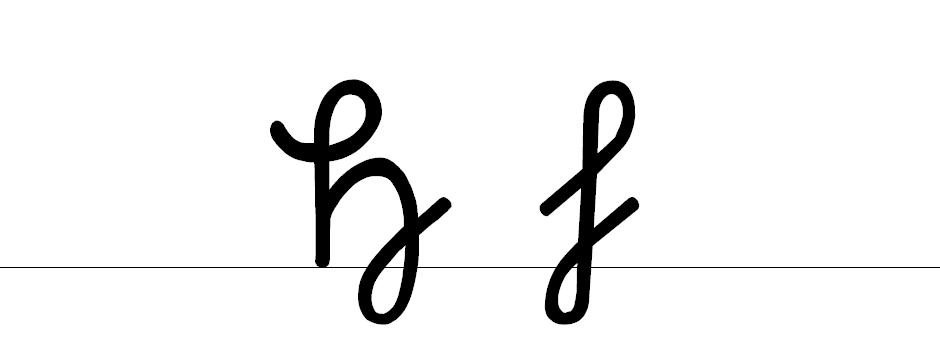

H h

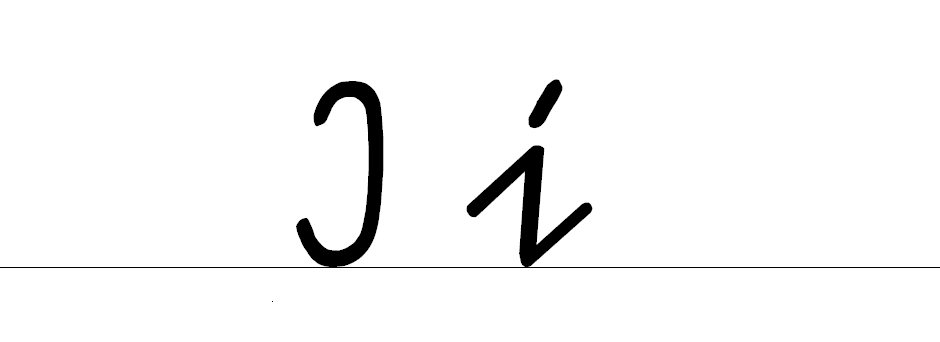

I i

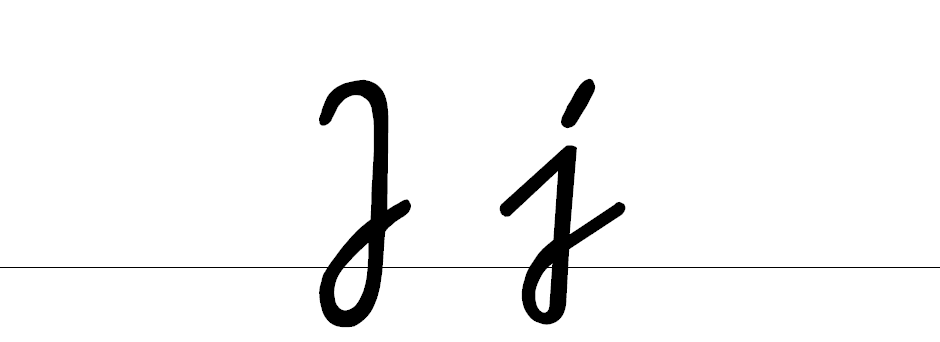

J j

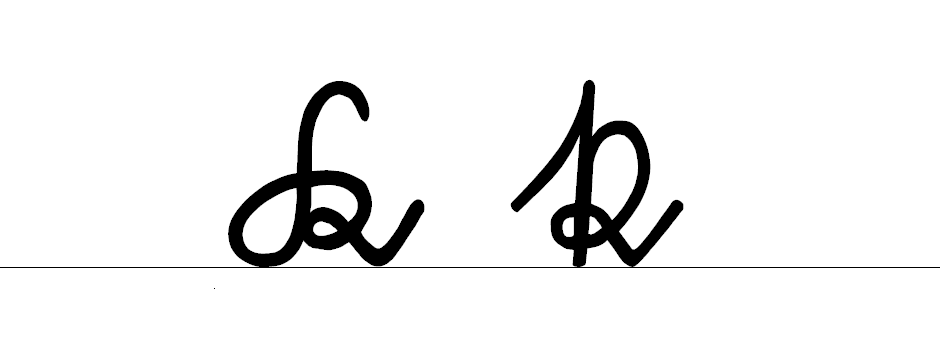

K k

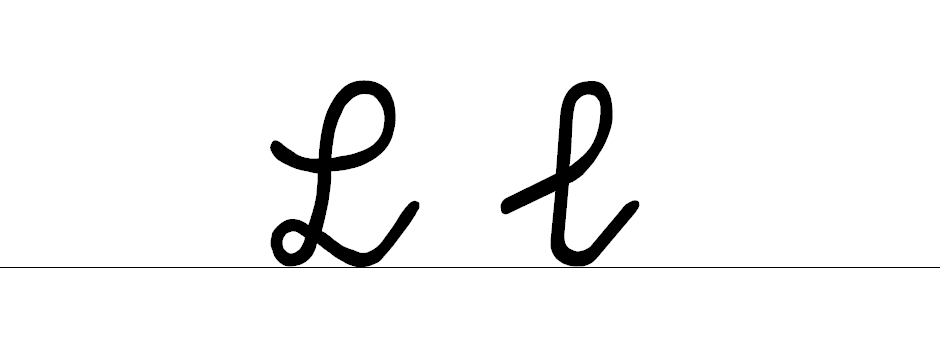

L l

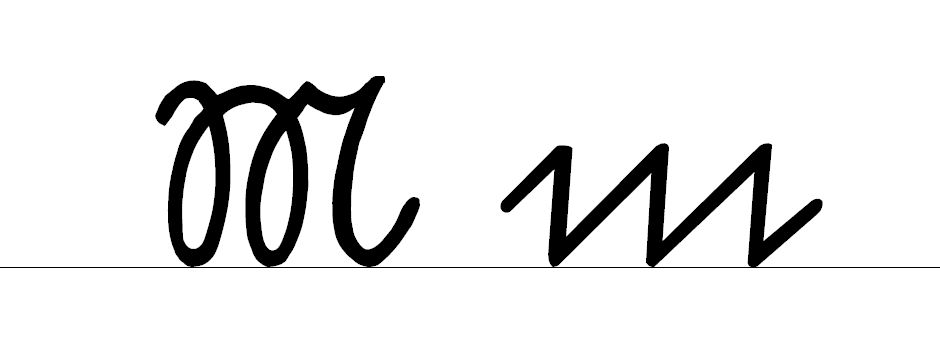

M m

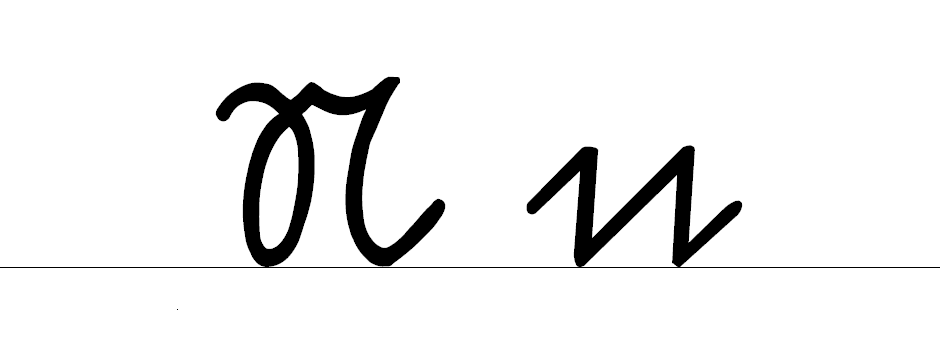

N n

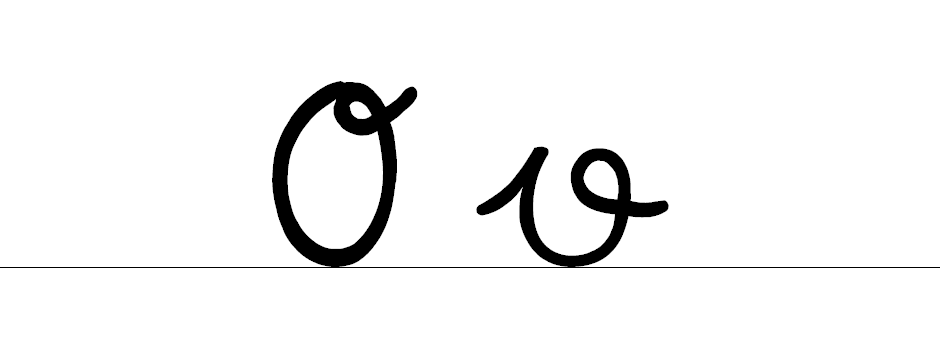

O o

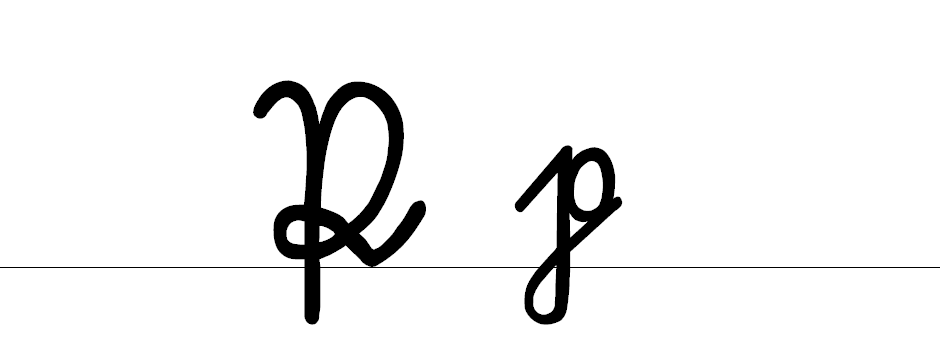

P p

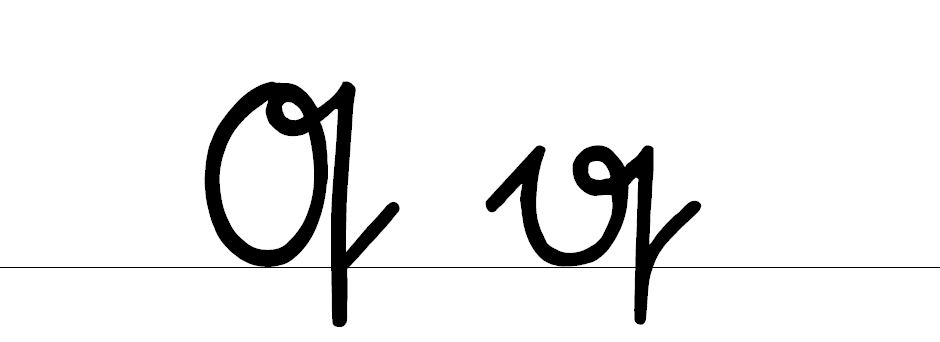

Q q

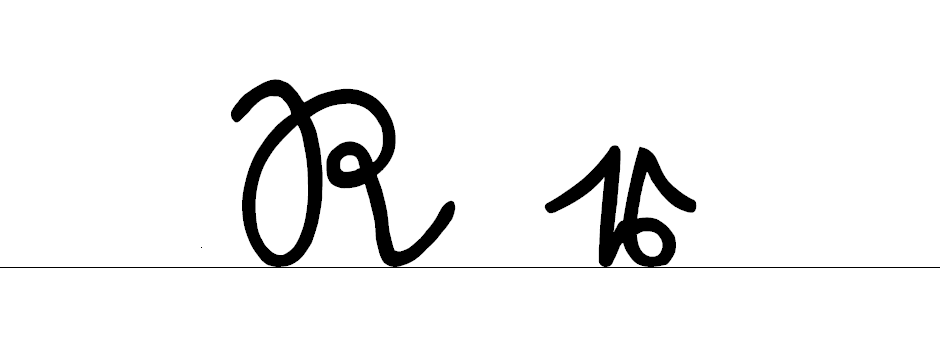

R r

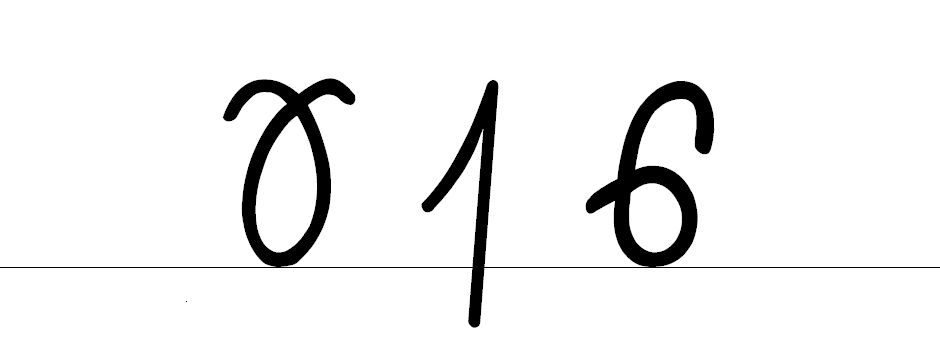

S ſ s

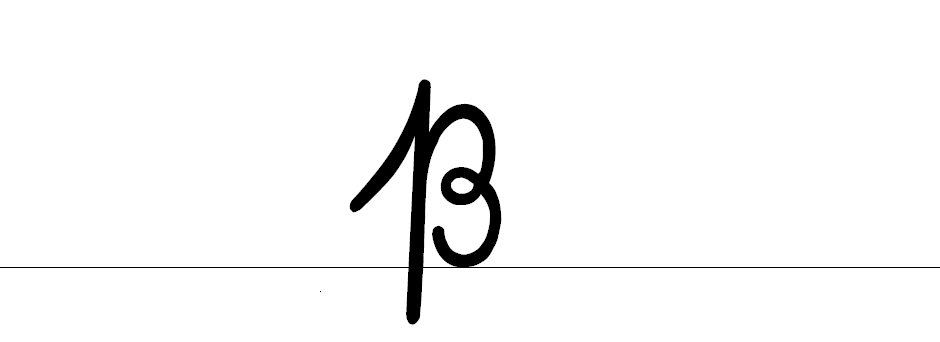

ß

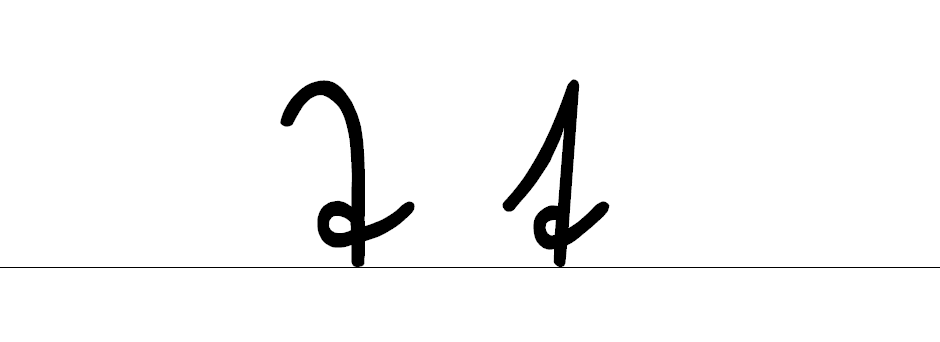

T t

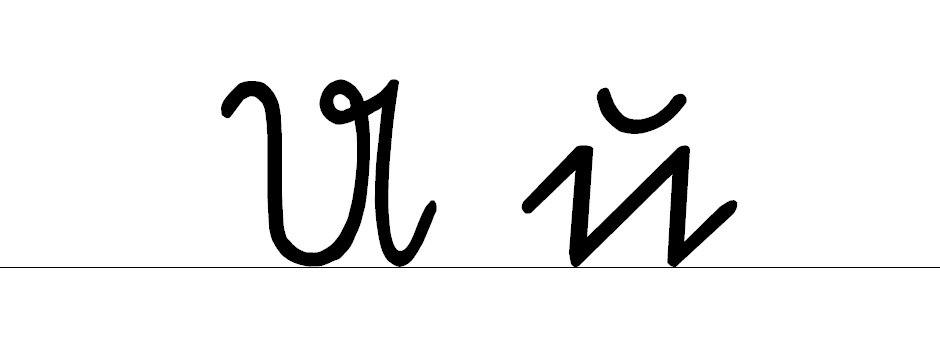

U u

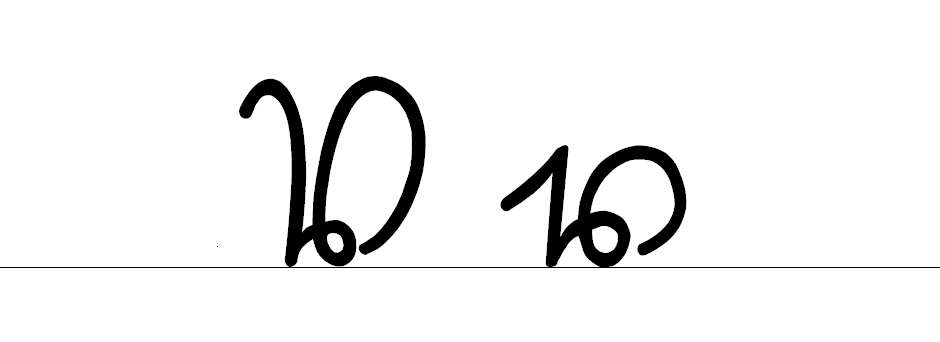

V v

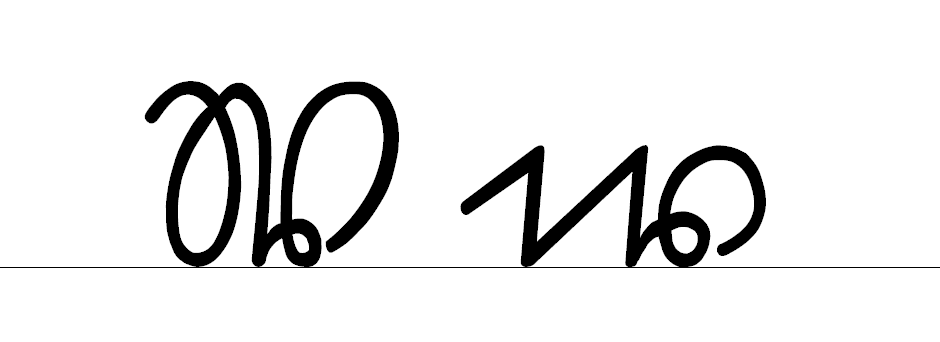

W w

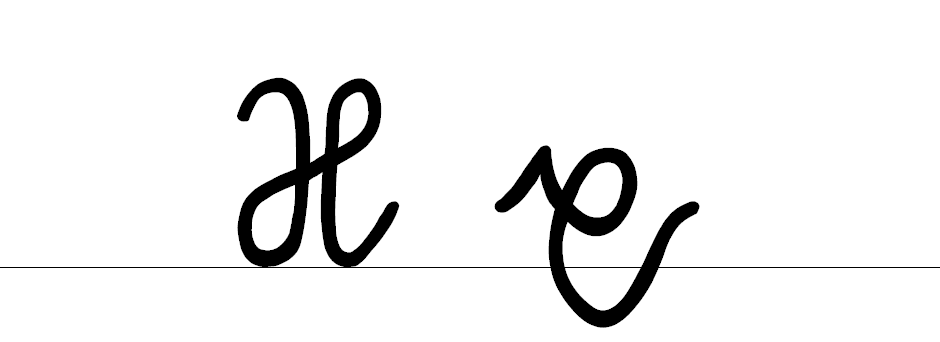

X x

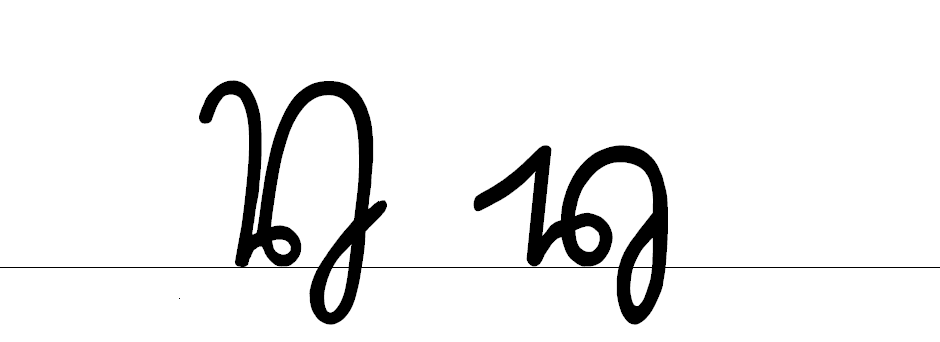

Y y

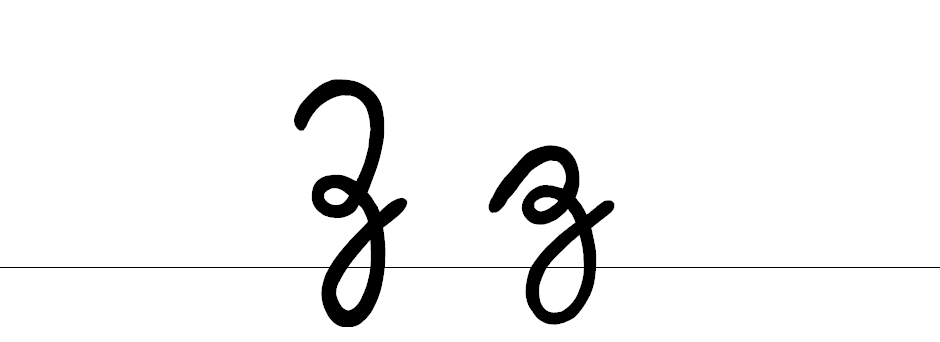

Z z

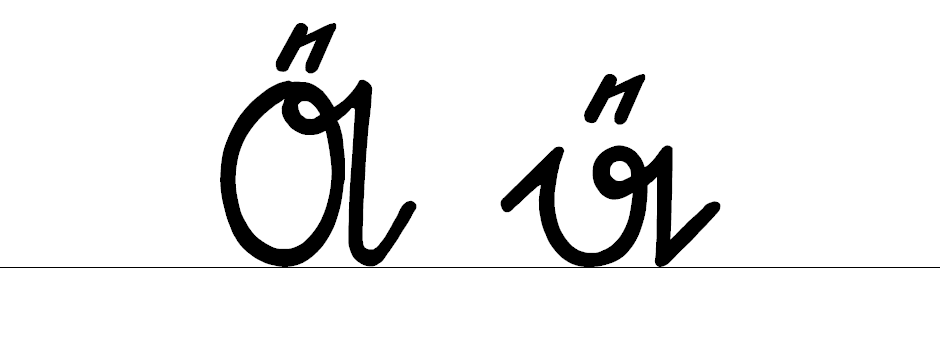

Ä ä

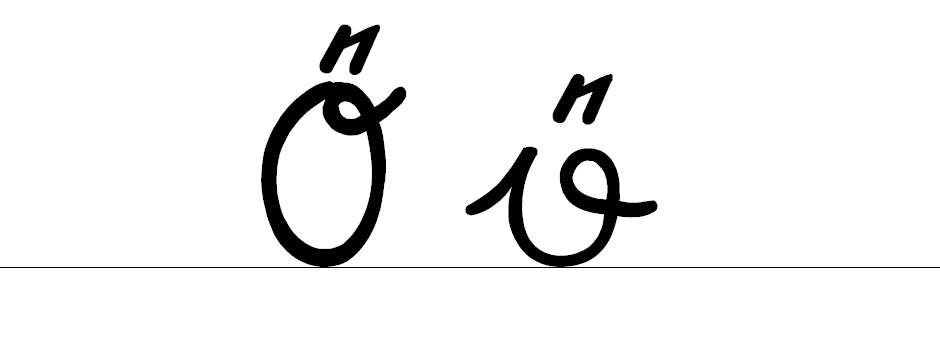

Ö ö

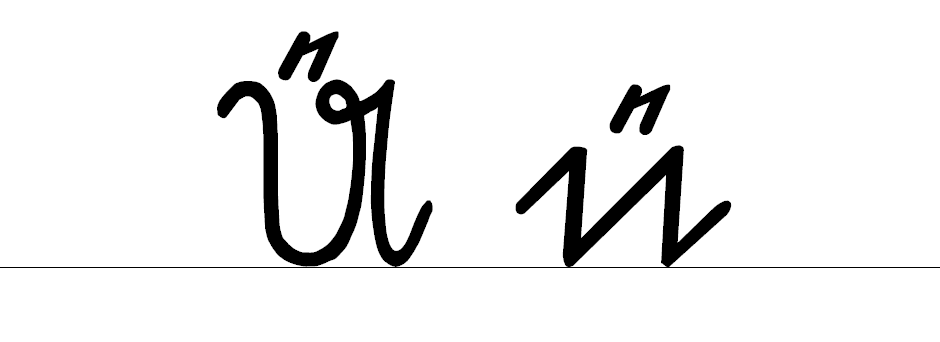

Ü ü

== See also ==
- Antiqua–Fraktur dispute
- Grundschrift
