= Tannenberg (typeface) =

Sans-serif typeface from 1934

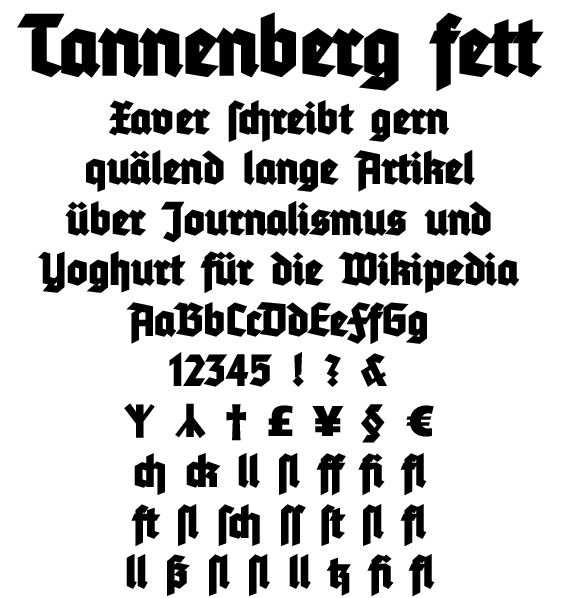
Tannenberg Bold

Tannenberg is a Fraktur-family blackletter typeface, developed between 1933 and 1935 by Erich Meyer at the type foundry D. Stempel AG in Frankfurt am Main. The design followed the "New Typography" principles of Jan Tschichold that promoted "constructed" sans serif typefaces. It is named after the Battle of Tannenberg in 1914, in which German troops under Paul von Hindenburg and Erich Ludendorff stopped the advance of Russian troops. Meyer's design for the typeface was inspired by Nazi ideology.

The typeface was produced as Tannenberg (1934), Tannenberg semi-bold (1934), Tannenberg bold (1934), Tannenberg narrow (1933), and Tannenberg light (1935).

== Usage ==
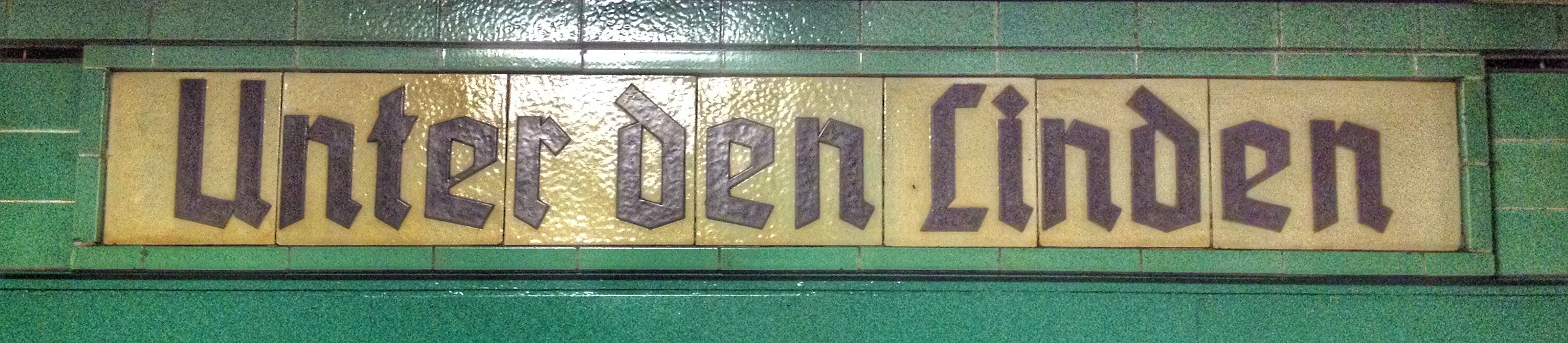
Unter den Linden station sign (1936)

The Tannenberg font soon became very popular and was widely used. It was used on official stamps, in book and magazine design, in advertising and in Nazi Party propaganda. From about 1935 to 1941, the Deutsche Reichsbahn used the Tannenberg typeface on station signs. These signs can still be seen on some stations of the Berlin North-South S-Bahn, which opened in 1936.

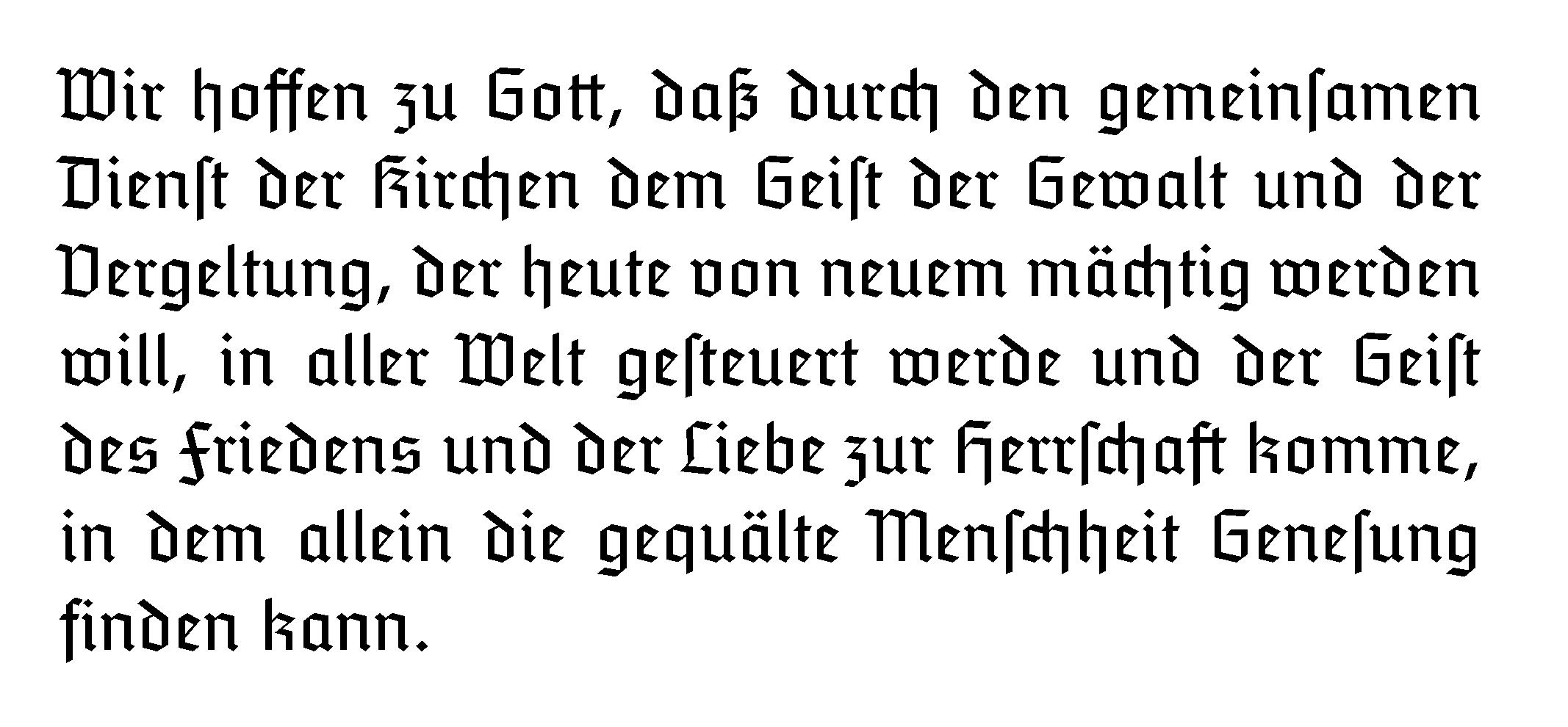
Excerpt from the Stuttgart Declaration of Guilt (Evangelical Church in Germany, January 1946)

Like all blackletter typefaces, Tannenberg was hardly used in official documents after Martin Bormann's "normal type decree" of 1941 ordered that Fraktur-style typefaces be no longer used. Nothing changed to reverse this policy with the end of the Nazi regime in 1945: in 1946, for example, the "Stuttgart Declaration of Guilt", published in the "Regulations and News Sheet of the Evangelical Church in Germany", was set in Tannenberg. Nevertheless, Fraktur typefaces soon drifted out of common use.

== See also ==
- Antiqua–Fraktur dispute – Typographical dispute in Germany
- Schwabacher – Blackletter typeface
