= Ella Josephine Sterling =

American artist (1908–2006)

Ella Josephine Sterling, Vase, c. 1936, Index of American Design, National Gallery of Art, Washington, DC.

Ella Josephine Sterling (1908–2006) was an American artist known for her illustrations for the Index of American Design. These illustrations are part of the collection of the National Gallery of Art. Her illustration of beaded purse was included in the 1936 exhibition and book New horizons in American art at the Museum of Modern Art.
