= Schwabacher =

Blackletter typeface

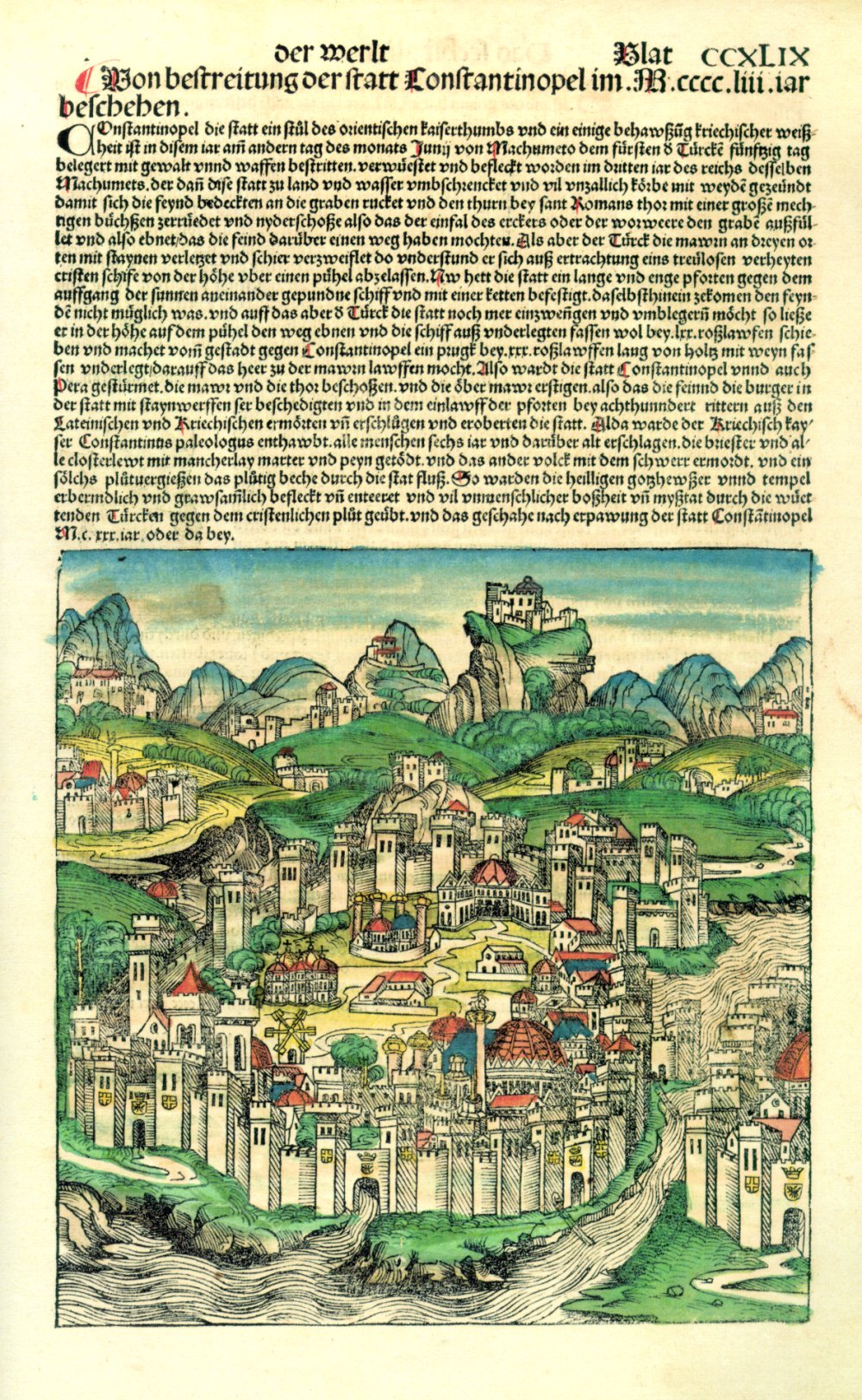
A page from the Nuremberg Chronicle (Schedelsche Weltchronik), 1493

Schwabacher typefaces (pronounced [ˈʃvaːˌbaxɐ]) were a style of blackletter typefaces which evolved from Gothic Textualis (Textura) under the influence of Humanist type design in Italy during the 15th century. Schwabacher typesetting was the most common typeface in Germany, until it was replaced by Fraktur from the mid 16th century onwards. In the course of the 18th and 19th centuries (but in Germany not until 1941), Fraktur gave way in turn to Antiqua.

== Etymology ==
The term may derive from the Franconian town of Schwabach, where, in 1529, the Articles of Schwabach, a Lutheran creed, were adopted; the Articles became the basis of the 1530 Confessio Augustana, and possibly also promoted the use of Schwabacher types.

== Characteristics ==
Blackletter typefaces

Similar to Rotunda, the rounded Schwabacher types were nearer to handwriting than the former Textualis style, though it also includes sharp edges. The lower-case g and upper-case H have particularly distinctive forms. In the context of German language texts, Schwabacher appeared vibrant and popular.

== History ==
While the Latin Gutenberg Bible was still set in Textualis type, the oldest preserved Schwabacher incunable dates from 1472, and was printed in Augsburg. Schwabacher types appeared in the Free Imperial City of Nuremberg from about 1485: Anton Koberger (c. 1440–1513) used them for the publication of the Nuremberg Chronicle (in both Latin and German) in 1493, and Albrecht Dürer (1471–1528) for his Apocalypse series in 1498. Schwabacher became widely known with the spread of Luther Bibles from 1522.

After Schwabacher was displaced by Fraktur as the most-used German language type style from about 1530, it remained in common use as a secondary typeface for emphasis in a similar way to italic. It was still used occasionally until the mid 20th century.

=== Normal type decree ===
In January 1941, the Government of Nazi Germany officially abandoned the Fraktur type, following Martin Bormann's Normalschrifterlass ("Normal type decree"). Bormann refers to Fraktur as Schwabacher Judenlettern ("Jew-letters of Schwabach"). The statement ignores the fact that Schwabacher originated from the earlier Rotunda blackletter script and late medieval Bastarda types. Despite Bormann's assertion, there is no evidence of any connection between Jews and the Schwabacher typeface; in fact, at the time of the typeface's origin, the ownership of printing houses was reserved for Christian citizens. The decree eliminating the use of Fraktur actually makes prominent use of Fraktur, including the party name (Nationalsozialistische Deutsche Arbeiterpartei) and other letterhead elements.

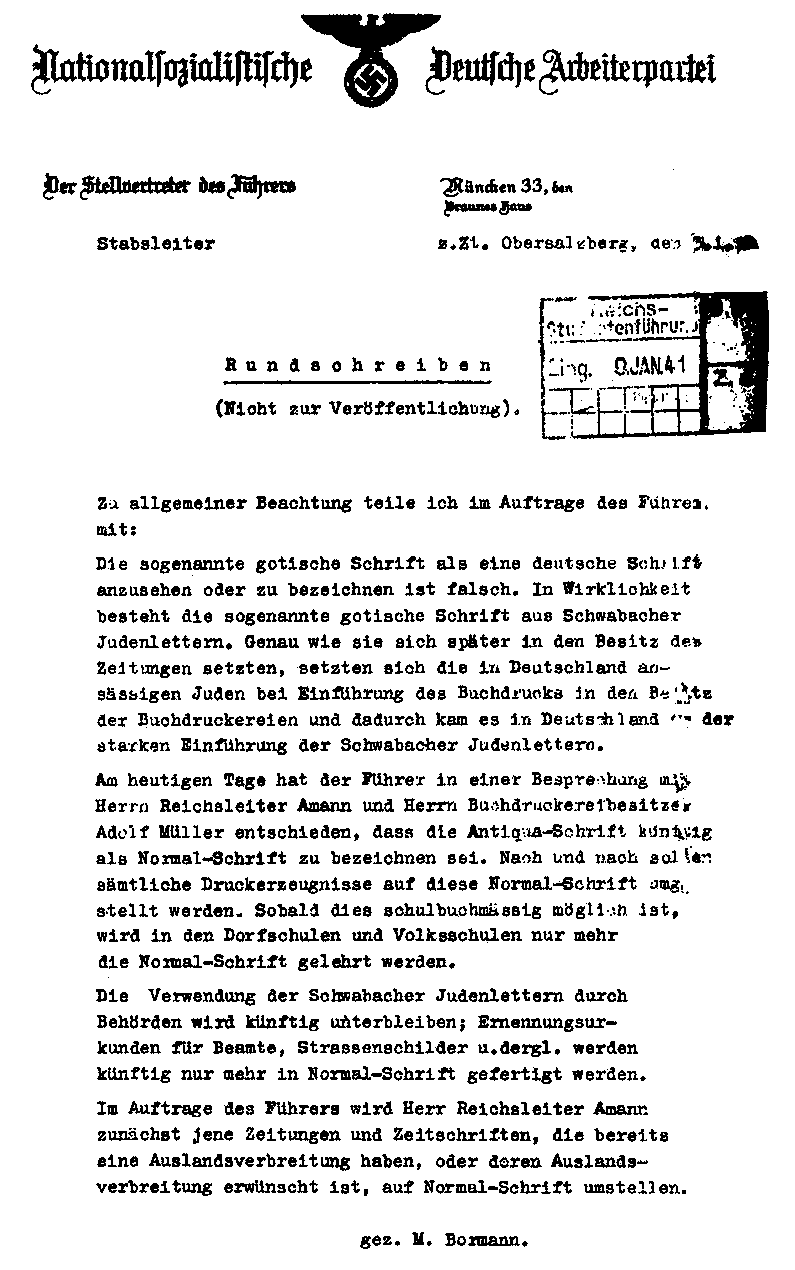
Normalschrifterlass by Martin Bormann

Circular
(Not for publication).

On behalf of the Führer I notify for common attention that:

Regarding and calling the so called gothic typeface as a German typeface is wrong. In fact, the gothic typeface consists of Jew-letters from Schwabach. Like how they later gained control of the newspapers, the Jews living in Germany had seized control over the printing shops at introduction of the printing press, so that the Schwabacher Jew-letters were heavily introduced in Germany.

Today the Führer decided in a meeting with Reichsleiter Max Amann and book printing shop owner Adolf Müller that the Antiqua typeface is to be called the normal typeface in future. Step by step all print products have to be changed to this normal typeface. As soon as this is possible for school books, in schools only the normal typeface will be taught.

Authorities will refrain from using the Schwabacher Jew-letters in future; certificates of appointment, road signs and similar will only be produced in normal typeface in future. On behalf of the Führer, Mr. Amann will first change those papers and magazines to normal typeface, that are already spread abroad or are wanted to be.

Signed M. Bormann

== Samples ==
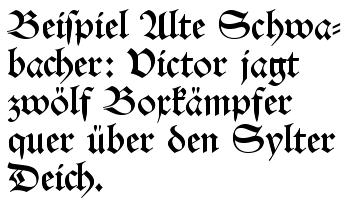
Alte Schwabacher

The German sentence in this sample reads: "Beiſpiel Alte Schwabacher [Example of Old Schwabacher]: Victor jagt zwölf Boxkämpfer quer über den Sylter Deich". This is a nonsense sentence meaning "Victor chases twelve boxers across the dike of Sylt", but contains all 26 letters of the alphabet plus the German umlauts and is thus an example of a pangram. The fourth letter of Beiſpiel is a long s.

== See also ==
- Antiqua–Fraktur dispute – Typographical dispute in Germany
