= Breitkopf & Härtel =

Music publisher in Leipzig, Germany

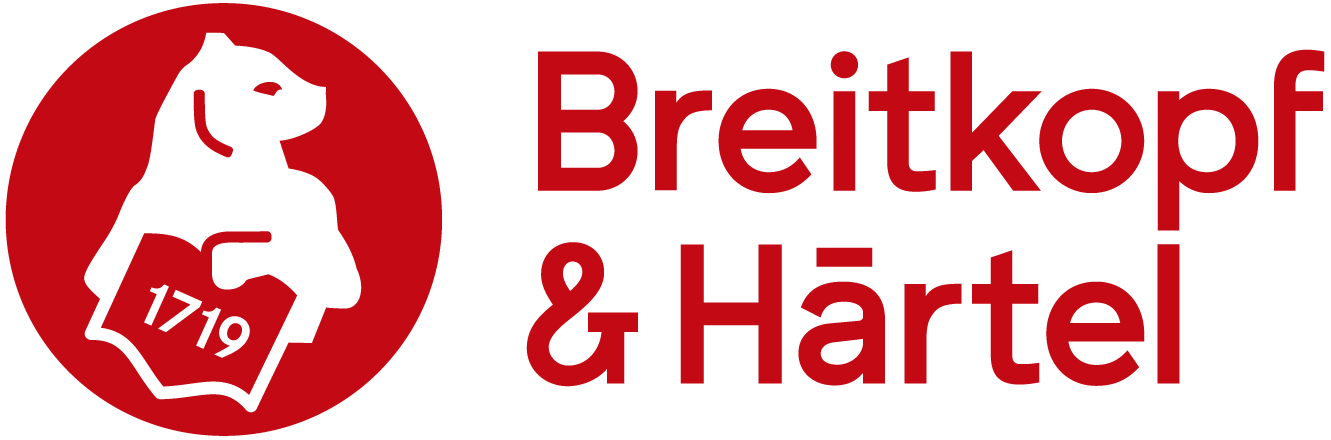
- Founded: 1719 in Leipzig
- Founder: Bernhard Christoph Breitkopf
- Country of origin: Germany
- Headquarters location: Wiesbaden
- Publication types: Sheet music
- Official website: www.breitkopf.com

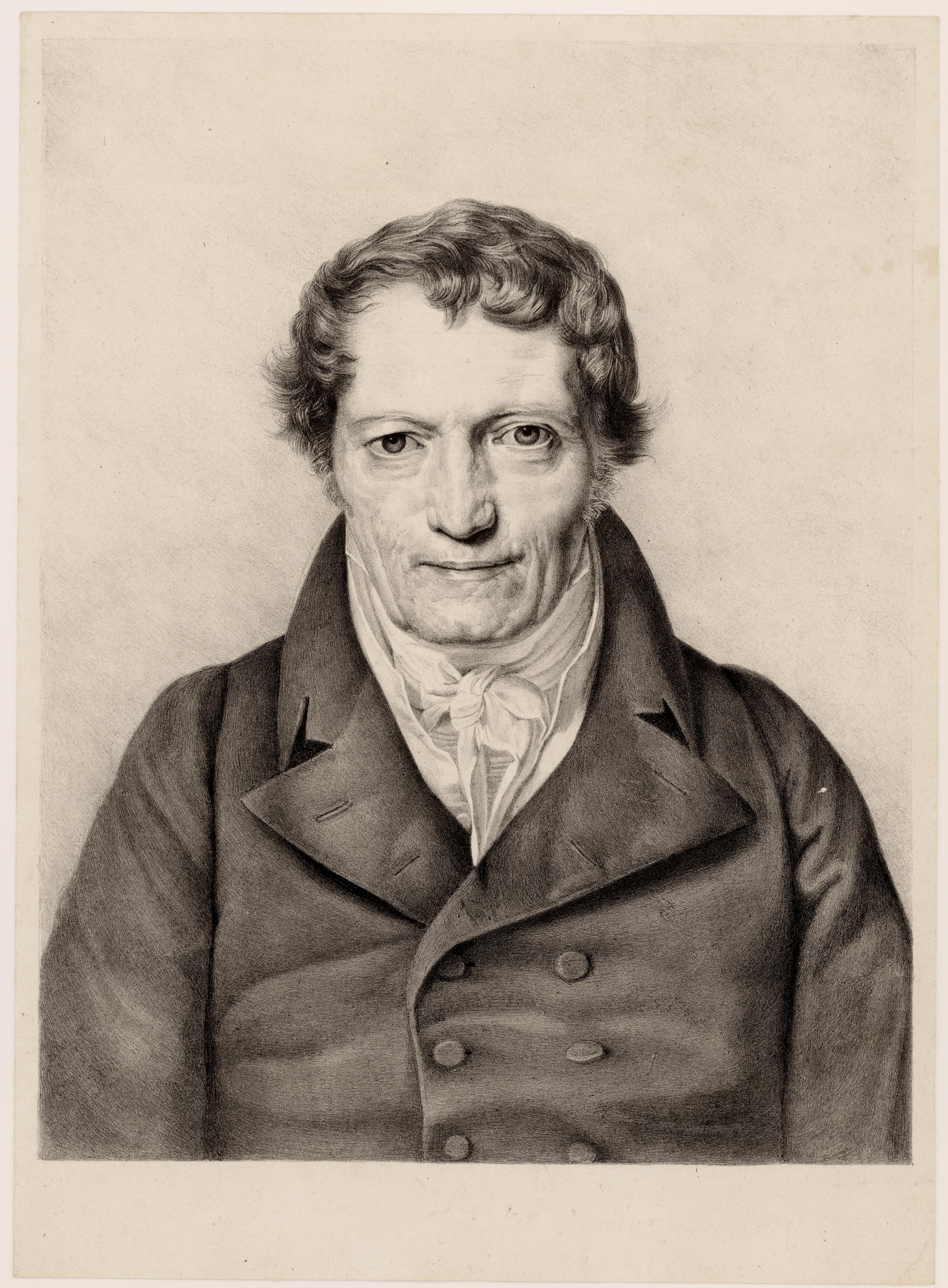
Gottfried Christoph Härtel

Breitkopf & Härtel (German pronunciation: [ˈbraɪtkɔpf ʔʊnt ˈhɛrtəl]) is a German music publishing house. Founded in 1719 in Leipzig by Bernhard Christoph Breitkopf, it is the world's oldest music publisher still active.

== Overview ==
The catalogue contains over 1,000 composers, 8,000 works and 15,000 music editions or books on music. The name "Härtel" was added when Gottfried Christoph Härtel took over the company in 1795. In 1807, Härtel began to manufacture pianos, an endeavour which lasted until 1870. Breitkopf pianos were highly esteemed in the 19th century by such pianists as Franz Liszt and Clara Schumann.

In the 19th century the company was for many years the publisher of the Allgemeine musikalische Zeitung, an influential music journal.

The company has consistently supported composers and had close editorial collaboration with Beethoven, Haydn, Mendelssohn, Schumann, Chopin, Liszt, Wagner and Brahms. In the 19th century they also published the first "complete works" editions of various composers, for instance Bach (the Bach-Gesellschaft edition), Mozart (the Alte Mozart-Ausgabe), and Schubert (the Franz Schubert's Werke). This tradition continues today with prominent contemporary composers such as Heinz Holliger, Helmut Lachenmann and Wolfgang Rihm.

The firm was on the board of directors of the Händel-Gesellschaft in 1858.

== Archives ==
Archival materials of the publishing house form the fonds 21081 Breitkopf & Härtel in the State Archives in Leipzig (part of the Saxon State Archives, in German Sächsisches Staatsarchiv).

== See also ==
- Johann Gottlob Immanuel Breitkopf
- Breitkopf Fraktur - a font invented by Johann Gottlob Immanuel Breitkopf
