= Humanist minuscule =

Medieval handwriting style

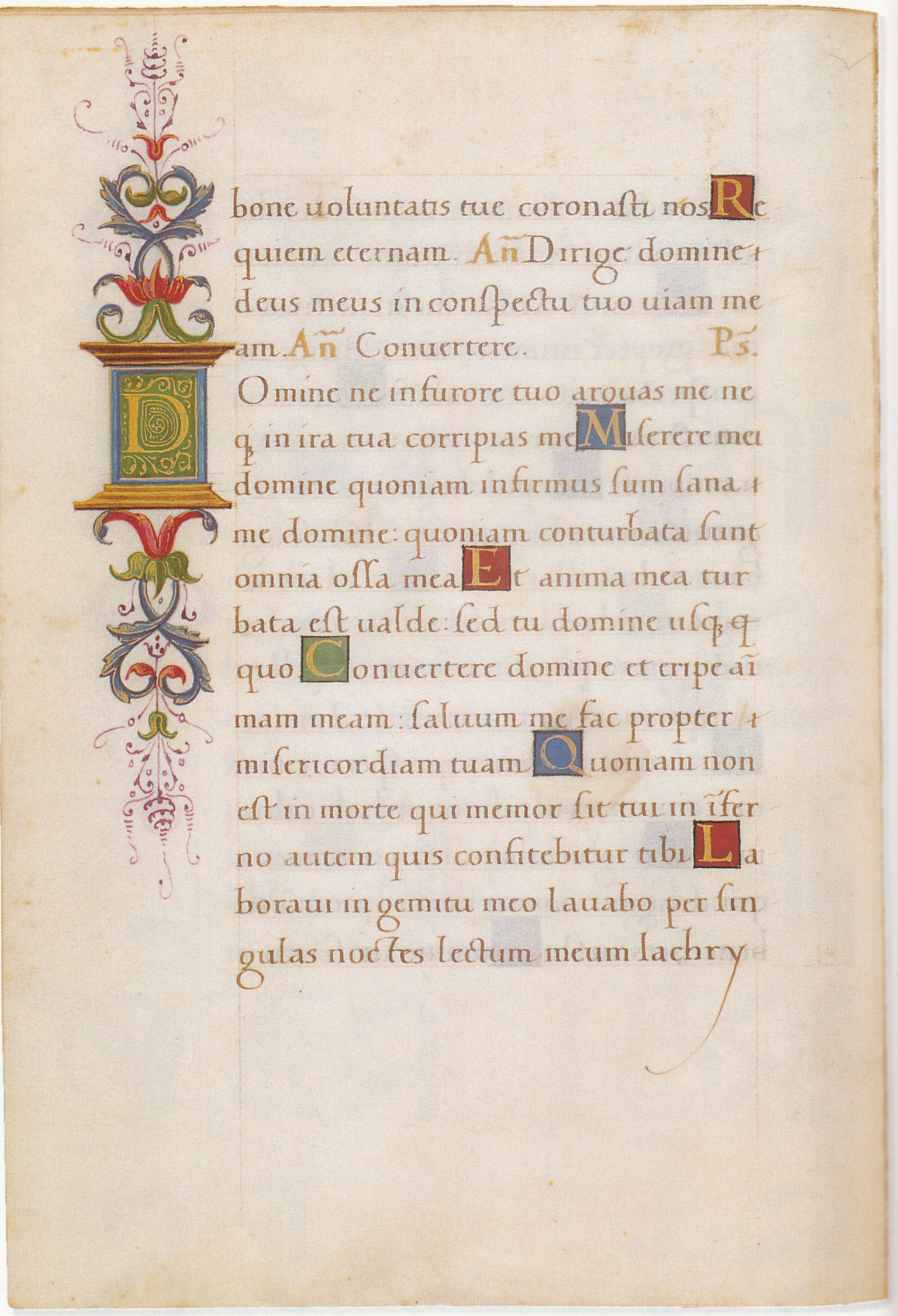
Page from the Book of Hours of Giovanni II Bentivoglio, Bologna, c. 1497–1500. Humanist minuscule with colored versals and decorations.

The evolution of minuscule Latin script

Humanist minuscule, or white letter, (Note: Cf. blackletter.) is a handwriting script or style of script that was invented in secular circles in Italy, at the beginning of the fifteenth century. The new hand was based on Carolingian minuscule, which Renaissance humanists took to be ancient Roman:

[W]hen they handled manuscript books copied by eleventh- and twelfth-century scribes, Quattrocento literati thought they were looking at texts that came right out of the bookshops of ancient Rome".

The humanistic term litterae antiquae (the "ancient letters") applied to this hand was an inheritance from the fourteenth century, where the phrase had been opposed to litterae modernae ("modern letters"), or blackletter.

The humanist minuscule was connected to the humanistic content of the texts for which it was the appropriate vehicle. By contrast, fifteenth-century texts of professional interest in the fields of law, medicine, and traditional Thomistic philosophy still being taught in the universities were circulated in blackletter, whereas vernacular literature had its own, separate, distinctive traditions. "A humanist manuscript was intended to suggest its contents by its look," Martin Davies has noted: "old wine in new bottles, or the very latest vintage in stylish new dress". With the diffusion of humanist manuscripts produced in the highly organized commercial scriptoria of Quattrocento Italy, the Italian humanist script reached the rest of Europe, a very important aspect which has not yet been fully explored.

== Petrarchan reform ==
In Petrarch's compact book hand, the wider leading and reduced compression and round curves are early manifestations of the reaction against the crabbed Gothic secretarial minuscule we know today as "blackletter". Petrarch was one of the few medieval authors to have written at any length on the handwriting of his time; in his essay on the subject, La scrittura, he criticized the current scholastic hand, with its laboured strokes (artificiosis litterarum tractibus) and exuberant (luxurians) letter-forms amusing the eye from a distance, but fatiguing on closer exposure, as if written for a purpose other than reading. For Petrarch, the gothic hand violated three principles: writing, he said, should be simple (castigata), clear (clara), and orthographically correct. Boccaccio was a great admirer of Petrarch; from Boccaccio's immediate circle this post-Petrarchan "semi-gothic" revised hand spread to literati in Florence, Lombardy, and the Veneto.

== Poggio Bracciolini ==
A more thorough reform of handwriting than the Petrarchan compromise was in the offing. The generator of the new style (illustration) was Poggio Bracciolini, a tireless pursuer of ancient manuscripts, who developed the new humanist script in the first decade of the 15th century. The Florentine bookseller Vespasiano da Bisticci recalled later in the century that Poggio had been a very fine calligrapher of lettera antica and had transcribed texts to support himself— presumably, as Martin Davies points out— before he went to Rome in 1403 to begin his career in the papal curia. Berthold Ullman identifies the watershed moment in the development of the new humanistic hand as the youthful Poggio's transcription of Cicero's Epistles to Atticus. By the time the Medici library was catalogued in 1418, almost half the manuscripts were noted as in the lettera antica. The new script was embraced and developed by the Florentine humanists and educators Niccolò de' Niccoli and Coluccio Salutati.

== Niccoli's cursive and Roman typeface ==
The neat, sloping, humanist cursive invented by the Florentine humanist Niccolò de' Niccoli in the 1420s and disseminated through his numerous scholars is usually characterized as essentially a rapid version of the same script. Rhiannon Daniels writes, however, that "[t]his was not humanistic bookhand written cursively, but a running script written with a very fine pen; a modification of contemporary gothic chancery script influenced by humanistic bookhand; hence it is sometimes known as cancelleresca all'antica". In the late fifteenth century this "chancery script in the Antique manner" was further developed by humanists in Rome. Calligraphic forms of this "chancery italic" were popularized by the famous Roman writing master Ludovico Arrighi in the early sixteenth century.

In the history of Western typography humanist minuscule gained prominence as a model for the typesetter's roman typeface, as it was standardized by Aldus Manutius, who introduced his revolutionary italic typeface based on the chancery hand in Venice, 1501, and was practised by designer-printers Nicolas Jenson and Francesco Griffo; roman type has helped establish the remarkable resistance to change of the modern Latin alphabet.

== See also ==
- Humanist (sans serif): styles of Modernist typefaces developed in the 1920s as part of the International Typographic Style, using features of letter shapes in the Humanist tradition.
- Antiqua (typeface class)
