= Bernhard Christoph Breitkopf =

German printer and publisher (1695-1777)

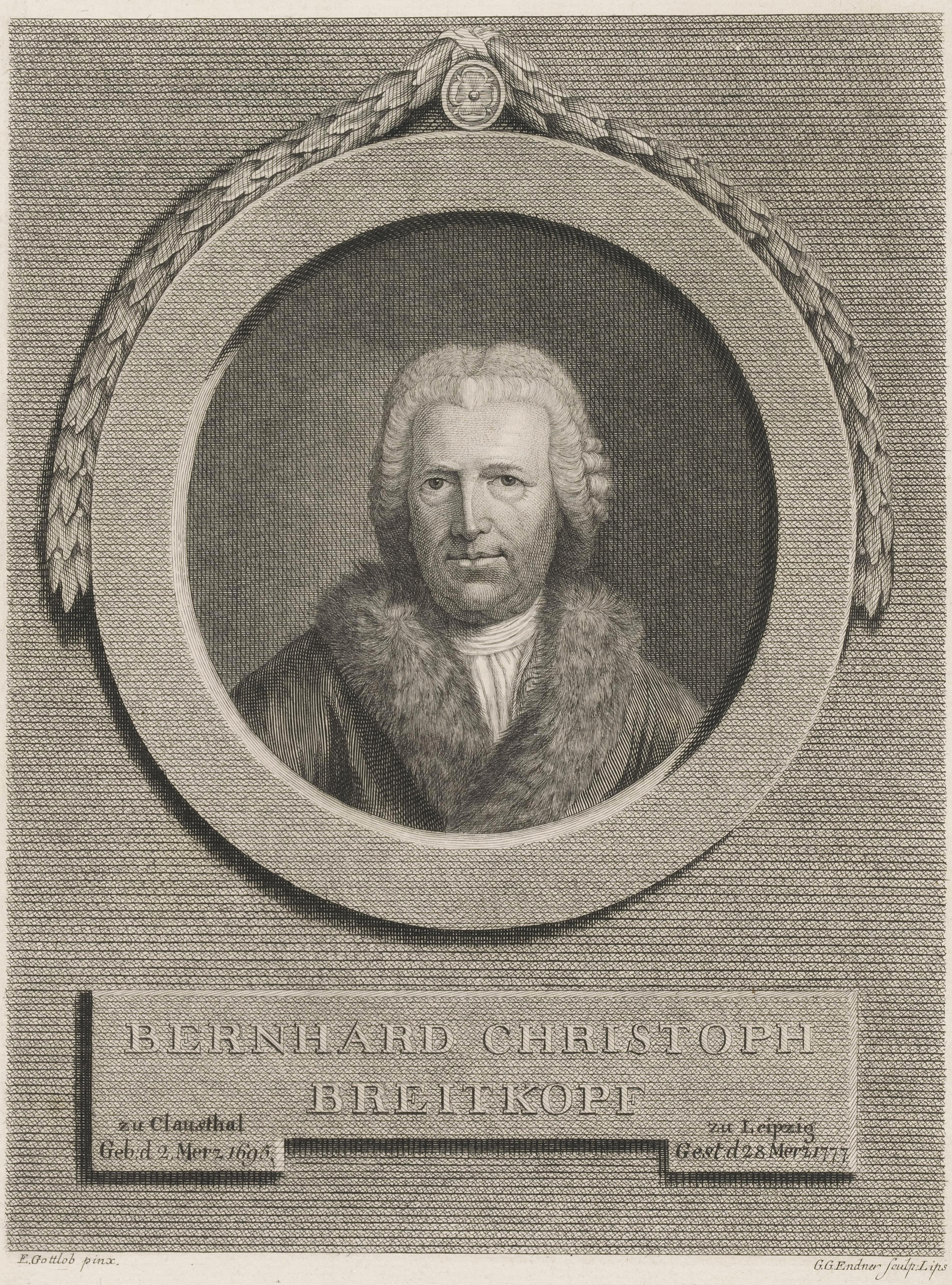
- Bernhard Christoph Breitkopf
- Born: March 2, 1695; Clausthal
- Died: March 26, 1777 (aged 82); Leipzig
- Occupations: Printer, publisher
- Notable work: Founder of Breitkopf & Härtel

Bernhard Christoph Breitkopf (2 March 1695 in Clausthal, now Clausthal-Zellerfeld – 26 March 1777 in Leipzig) was a German printer and publisher, and founder of the publisher that became Breitkopf & Härtel.

In 1714 he moved to Leipzig and worked for one year in a print shop. After working for several months in Jena, and three years in Halle, Saxony-Anhalt, he returned to Leipzig in 1718, married Sophia Maria Müller and inherited an existing print shop, established in 1664, which he rescued from the brink of economic ruin. He began publishing with the 1723 printing of a manual of the Hebrew Bible. After the death of his wife, Breitkopf remarried in 1739 to Sophia Theodore Kayser. He passed on the printing business to his son Johann Gottlob Immanuel Breitkopf in 1745. He maintained the publishing side of the business until his death, however his son became a partner in 1762.
