= Johann Gottlob Immanuel Breitkopf =

German music publisher and typographer (1719-1794)

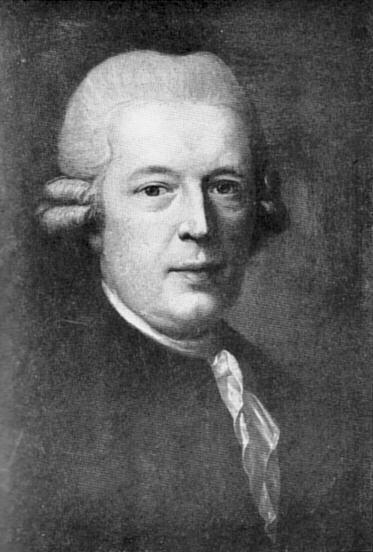
- Johann Gottlob Immanuel Breitkopf
- Born: November 23, 1719; Leipzig
- Died: January 28, 1794 (aged 74); Leipzig
- Education: local university
- Occupations: Music publisher, typographer
- Notable work: Breitkopf Fraktur

Johann Gottlob Immanuel Breitkopf (Leipzig, 23 November 1719 – 28 January 1794, Leipzig) was a German music publisher and typographer.

== Biography ==
Breitkopf was the son of the publisher Bernhard Christoph Breitkopf, founder of the publishing house Breitkopf & Härtel. He was born in Leipzig and eventually attended the local university. His investigations in history and mathematics led him to a scientific study of printing, which resulted in a more artistic development of German text, and an improvement of musical notation (1754). He revolutionized the music score printing with movable types, and fonts designed as Breitkopf Fraktur.
