= Martin Hopkinson & Co. =

Martin Hopkinson & Co. was a British publishing house, based in London, founded in 1922. It was taken over by The Bodley Head in 1941, but continued to publish reprints of books in its list until the 1970s.

== Beginnings ==
The company was established in December 1922 at 6, John Street, Adelphi, Westminster WC2. An announcement in The Bookseller and the Stationery Trades’ Journal stated that its business would be as “Publishers, book and print sellers, art journalists, literature agents, stationers, etc.” and the directors were named as M. Hopkinson, G. S. Williams, and P. H. Lee Warner.” Martin Hopkinson was the youngest son of the academic and politician Alfred Hopkinson (1851-1939) and in 1930 Alfred Hopkinson's book "Penultima" was published by the company. Martin's older brother Austin authored one of the books published by the company in its first year, Austin was an MP at the time.

Philip Lee Warner was a publisher under his own name, with a printing business known as the Chiswick Press, and in 1923 the new company took over his press and publications, including the new limited edition of European Hand Firearms of the Sixteenth, Seventeenth & Eighteenth Centuries, of which 550 copies had been printed. Those still in hand had labels attached to them reading “Publishing taken over by Martin Hopkinson & Co. Ltd”.

== New Aldine Library ==
In October 1923, Martin Hopkinson and Co. announced that through the Chiswick Press it would continue to reprint volumes from the “Aldine Series”, a selection of classics made by William Pickering and printed by Charles Whittingham at the Chiswick Press in the early nineteenth century. The series had been named after Venice’s Aldine Press, and the first two titles in the New Aldine Library were The Thoughts of the Emperor Marcus Aurelius Antoninus, translated by George Long, and The Sonnets of William Shakespeare with the Latin translation of A. T. Barton.

== Takeover ==
In 1941, John Lane the Bodley Head announced that it had acquired “the list of publications and goodwill of two smaller publishing houses, Gerald Howe Ltd., and Martin Hopkinson Ltd.” The Publisher noted that the Martin Hopkinson authors included Cecil Day Lewis, H. L. Mencken, and Sir Daniel Hall, and that the firm’s list included “a number of the best gardening books”.

While no longer actively publishing new titles, the Martin Hopkinson name did not disappear, and it continued to issue reprints of old titles from time to time until the 1970s.
