= Mary Byfield =

English book illustrator and wood-engraver (1795–1871)

- Born: 1795; London
- Died: 1871 (aged 75–76); Islington, London
- Known for: Book illustration and printmaking

Mary Byfield (baptized 11 November 1795 – 1871) was an English book illustrator and wood engraver. She and Ann Byfield were "artist engravers on wood" with a business in Florence Street, Islington.

== Biography ==
Byfield was born in London into a family of wood engravers. Taught by their father, Mary Byfield often worked with her brothers John (1788-1841) and Ebenezer (1790-1817) to produce engraved illustrations for books. These included several volumes for the writer Thomas Frognall Dibdin. Mary and John Byfield also produced illustrations for the Chiswick Press, notably for the works of William Pickering. Working alone, Mary Byfield also produced engravings for several other volumes and designed a version of the Oxford University arms that became, for a time, the mark of the Oxford University Press. She worked for the printer Charles Whittingham and his nephew, Charles at the Chiswick Press throughout her life. As well as full page illustrations, her work included engraved alphabets for the first letter of a page, head and tail pieces, decorative borders and vignettes. Byfield taught several other members of her family, and members of the Whittingham family, wood engraving techniques. For most of her life, Byfield lived in the Holloway area of London, notably at Canonbury Place and Liverpool Road.

== Works illustrated ==
Works illustrated in whole, or part, by Mary Byfield include,

Drop letter "U" in The First Six Books of the Elements of Euclid

- Bibliotheca Spenciana by Thomas Frognal Dibdin, 1814, 4 volumes, with John Byfield
- Bibliographical Decameron, 1817, with John Byfield
- Typographical Antiquities by Thomas Frognal Dibdin, 1819
- Icones veteris testamenti, 1830, with John Byfield
- South Yorkshire by Joseph Hunter, 1831
- The Dance of Death by Francis Douce, 1833, with John Byfield
- Reminiscences of a Literary Life, 1836, with John Byfield
- Memorials of Cambridge by Orlando Jewitt, 1841
- A Summer's Day at Windsor, or A Visit to Eton by Edward Jesse, 1841
- Bibliotheca Spenciana by Thomas Frognal Dibdin, 1842
- History of the Orders of Knighthood by Nicolas, 1842
- First Six books of the Elements of Euclid By Oliver Byrne, 1847
- Queen Elizabeth's Prayer Book of 1569, 1853.
- Miscellanies of The Philobiblon Society, 1855
- John William Bradley and J. G. Goodwin's Manual of Illumination, published for Winsor and Newton, 1861 (with Ann Byfield)
