= Charles Whittingham (disambiguation) =

Charles Whittingham (1767–1840) was an English printer.

Charles Whittingham may also refer to

- Charles Whittingham (1795–1876), English printer
- Charles E. Whittingham (1913–1999), American thoroughbred horse trainer
- Charles Whittingham (priest) (1664–1743), Irish Anglican priest
