= The First Six Books of the Elements of Euclid =

1847 visual edition of Euclid's Elements

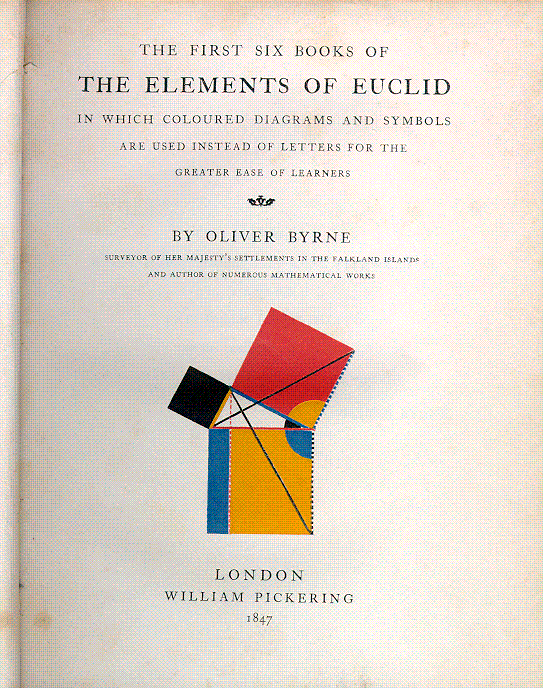
- Author: Oliver Byrne
- Original title: The First Six Books of the Elements of Euclid in Which Coloured Diagrams and Symbols Are Used Instead of Letters for the Greater Ease of Learners
- Publisher: William Pickering, Chiswick Press
- Publication date: 1847
- Publication place: London

The First Six Books of the Elements of Euclid was published by Oliver Byrne in 1847. It differs substantially from traditional editions of Euclid's Elements in its innovative use of diagrams, colour and typography to provide a more natural way of understanding the various proofs. Although not commercially successful at the time of publication it has more recently been praised by educators, book designers and artists.

Euclid's Elements has been referred to as the most successful textbook ever written. and over a thousand editions have been published. Byrne’s is significantly different: it is vibrantly colourful and methodologically unique. As was common at the time, the book had a lengthy title: "The First Six Books of the Elements of Euclid in Which Coloured Diagrams and Symbols Are Used Instead of Letters for the Greater Ease of Learners." The title, although cumbersome, explains the main concept behind the book.

The book has become the subject of renewed interest in recent years for its innovative graphic conception and its style which prefigures the modernist experiments of the Bauhaus and De Stijl movements. Information design writer Edward Tufte refers to the book in his work on graphic design and McLean in his Victorian book design of 1963. In 2010 Taschen republished the work in a facsimile edition and in 2017 a project was launched to extend the work to the remaining works of Euclid.

== The concept of the book ==
In the 19th century, geometry had a central role in the curriculum and was regarded as an essential component of a balanced programme of education. Byrne's experience as a professor and the difficulties he ran into while trying to teach his students lengthy formulas and complex demonstrations led him to the design of this book.

Byrne believed that colours express themselves in mind at higher speeds than any other information and, hence, they are able to speed up the processes of learning and storage. He says in the Introduction "illustration, if it does not shorten the time of study, will at least make it more agreeable". Alessandra Cirafici attributes this idea to the Theory of Colours by Johann Wolfgang von Goethe.

== How Byrne's method works ==
Historically, illustrated mathematics featured pairings of textual proof statements with corresponding black and white diagrams. Instead, but Byrne used pictorial elements incorporated directly into the framing text. Colour plays a crucial role in his process :the idea is that learners are doing less work than usual because they are not constantly flipping between the proof and the pictures, scanning eyes back and forth between words and images to see which part of the diagram is intended by the term ‘ABC' in the written section. In Byrne's scheme, diagrammatic elements are embedded in the proof.

=== Example ===
In this example Byrne proves Euclid's proposition (Book 3, Prop 22) that the opposite angles of any quadrilateral figure inscribed in a circle add up to 180° ("two right angles"). Note the ‘long' lower-case ‘s', or ‘ſ', which can look like an 'f' to the modern reader.

Before Byrne, a traditional proof included phrases such as "Add the angle ABC to each. Therefore the sum of the angles ABC, BAC, and ACB equals the sum of the angles ABC and ADC. But the sum of the angles ABC, BAC, and ACB equals two right angles, therefore the sum of the angles ABC and ADC also equal two right angles." As is shown below, Byrne completely eliminates this "alphabet macaroni" and represents directly with colours in the proof.

The page demonstrates Byrne's philosophy that coloured elements can be understood much more easily than traditional symbols. Tufte states that the intermingling of text and graphical elements in the same space seems to speed up recognition.

== Production ==
There were severe difficulties in implementing this approach. Not the least was the difficulty of accurate colour printing. For example Audobon's Birds of America, printed at about the same time had colourists who applied each colour in assembly-line fashion (over fifty were hired for the work).

Byrne was lucky to find a publisher who was prepared to take on the task. He found William Pickering, who arranged for the book to be printed by the Chiswick Press under the direction of Charles Whittingham II (nephew of the founder). According to Oechslin, the book made a "triumphal appearance" at the Great Exhibition in London 1851.

Byrne's book was also associated with the antiquarian revival at Chiswick Press, including use of the ‘old-style' Caslon font, which features the ‘long' lower-case ‘s', or ‘ſ', more familiar from early modern print (Although challenging for the modern reader, this style was retained in the Taschen 2010 edition.) Byrne's Elements was later mentioned as one of the most successful products of this movement, and was described as "that gayest of all school books, the Euclid of 1847, with illustrations in colour". It was one of only four colour-printed books that the Chiswick Press ever produced.

Antiquarian-style border by Whittingham, from Byrne'e Euclid

Moriarty says there is a bold modernity to the illustrations; the bright colours and geometric forms have a very modern feel, and yet the text has elements that hark back to a much earlier era of printing. It includes Whittingham's antiquarian-style borders. The production also included decorated capitals similar to those in mediaeval illustrated manuscripts, by engraver and illustrator Mary Byfield.

Such a production was bound to be expensive. The volume cost 25 shillings at a time when a comparable edition in black and white would have been about 5 shillings. This put it out of the reach of simple educators at whom the work was directed. Consequently sales were limited and in the end the printers were left with about 75% of the print run. In fact the production costs of this work (and similar high-class examples of elaborate printing) contributed to the bankruptcy of Pickering a few years later.

== Artistic impact ==
Byrne himself was clear that he hadn't introduced colours for the purpose of entertainment, or for artistic combinations but to assist the reader in their understanding of the material. However, according to Moriarty, the bright primary colours and geometric focus easily bring to mind the work of Piet Mondrian, Sophie Taeuber-Arp, Kazimir Malevich and Wassily Kandinsky.

== Initial reception ==
Despite its sensational appearance, Byrne's Elements did not prove popular, being too far removed from prior mathematical texts for most readers. His book was generally dismissed as a curiosity and his system was derided as too confusing, a solution to a non-existent problem.

=== Cajori and De Morgan ===
Byrne and his work was seen by his contemporaries as a mere curiosity and almost ignored by the history of mathematics. Florian Cajori writing in 1928, stated that Byrne's work was not taken seriously enough and often approached with ‘curiosity' more than a real scientific interest.

Augustus De Morgan writing a couple of years after publication maintained that those who introduce symbols in elementary geometry are somehow breaking that ‘mechanical relationship' that every student establishes with it. Oechslin suggested this criticism is targeted at Byrne's Book V, which is about number theory, and that de Morgan dislike him, having previously criticised his earlier work,

Ruari McLean described the work as "one of the oddest and most beautiful books of the whole [19th] century...a triumph for Charles Whittingham [the printer]."

The page is a unique riot of red, yellow and blue: on some pages letters and numbers are sprinkled over the page like tiny wildflowers: elsewhere, solid squares, triangles and circles are printed in gaudy and theatrical splashes, attaining a verve not seen again on book pages till the days of Dufy, Matisse and Derain. — Ruari McLean, Victorian Book Design 1963

=== Educational aims ===
Women are rarely a focus of general mathematical instructions, and are explicitly mentioned in the introduction to the work. Byrne believed that his visual teaching system might appeal more to young women because of how their education encouraged them to appreciate and respond to beauty. He thus recommended those involved in educating girls to attend to ‘this very attractive mode of communicating knowledge'. He also considered the benefits of his system for students with different learning abilities: ‘this visible system is no less adapted to the exigencies of the deaf and dumb'.

== Recent re-evaluation ==
=== Werner Oechslin ===
Werner Oechslin in his essay "To facilitate their acquirement" explains that Byrne and De Morgan may have had a personal rivalry that predates the work. It is not difficult to imagine why one of the first prominent modern logicians, who had a vested interest in the abstract processes at work in geometry, was so reviled by a work like that of Byrne, which intentionally sought to eliminate much of the abstraction in geometrical thought.

Composition with Red, Blue and Yellow Mondrain (1930). Byrne's use of colour has been compared with abstract art.

Oechslin states that Byrne's book is a predecessor to the work of Mondrian and the other artists of the De Stijl school of modern art. Byrne and Mondrian are strikingly similar in visual appearance (relying upon basic geometrical shapes and primary colours). He claims that it seems that despite these key visual similarities, Byrne and Mondrian arrived in these similar realms of thought while moving in opposite directions: Byrne sought to reduce abstraction to teach geometry that was rooted in specific empirical figures; Mondrian's neo-plastic approach to art on the other hand intentionally reduced empirical forms to simple, abstract shapes and colours.

This essay is included in the Taschen facsimile edition of 2010

=== Edward Tufte ===
Edward Tufte devotes a chapter to Byrne in his book Envisioning Information. He criticised typical mathematics books as "too much time must be spent decoding alphabet macaroni" but judged that Byrne clarified Euclid with the use of colour. It has long been argued that some mathematics should be classified as art. Tufte noted that the colours chosen (black, red, yellow and blue) provided maximum differentiation for the student and that it also anticipated the primary colours and abstract shapes of 20th century art, such as the works of Piet Mondrian.

== Legacy ==
Byrne died in 1880 and his work passed out of copyright in 1947, to be rediscovered in the late 20th century by a new generation of book-lovers, graphic and information design experts and mathematicians.

=== Byrne system extended ===
Oliver Byrne's original ambition was never fully realized. An independent publisher, Kronecker Wallis undertook a project to extend Byrne's project from the first six books of Euclid's Elements to all thirteen.

The completed work demonstrates that Byrne's method scales successfully to advanced topics. Books VII through XIII cover number theory, solid geometry, and the construction of the five Platonic solids. These abstract concepts are also well illuminated by visual representation, perhaps more so than the first six books of Byrne.

=== On-line version for educators ===
Nicholas Rougeux built a new website to bring Byrne's original edition to a modern audience by reproducing the entire book online so it would be accessible to anyone with smartphone, tablet or computer, but still aiming to be as true to the original as possible. Each diagram was created by tracing the originals and ensuring their dimensions and relationships stayed true to Euclid's geometric principles. Proofs accompanying each diagram have been enhanced with clickable shapes to aid in understanding the shapes being referenced. The original Caslon type face was used and the initials that were originally designed by Mary Byfield that adorn the beginning of each chapter were faithfully reproduced.

=== Modern Facsimile editions ===
Although copies of the original 1847 edition survive, they are hard to source and typically sell for thousands of pounds: a copy was sold by Bonhams for £8320 in 2025. To make the work more widely accessible, publisher Taschen launched a facsimile edition in 2010, and called it "A masterwork of art and science, it is as beautiful in the boldness of its red, yellow, and blue figures and diagrams as it is in the mathematical precision of its theories. In the simplicity of forms and colours, the pages anticipate the vigour of De Stijl and Bauhaus design. In making complex information at once accessible and aesthetically engaging, this work is a forerunner to the information graphics that today define much of our data consumption.

This version was reviewed in the New York Times, which notes that the illustrations are the spitting image of de Stijl or Bauhaus. The article suggests that the diagrams are so effective at explaining complex concepts they could be used by anyone just using an iPhone.
