= Whittingham =

Whittingham may refer to:

- Whittingham (surname)

== Places ==
- Whittingham, Lancashire, England
- Whittingham, Northumberland, England
- Whittingham, New Jersey, a US unincorporated area
- Whittingham, New South Wales, in Australia

== See also ==
- Whittingehame, a small village in East Lothian, Scotland
