= Samuel Whittingham =

Samuel Whittingham may refer to:

- Sir Samuel Ford Whittingham (1772–1841), British Army general
- Sam Whittingham (footballer) (1882–1958), English footballer

== See also ==
- Whittingham (surname)
