= Aldine Edition of the British Poets =

Series of reprints of classic works of literature

The Aldine Edition of the British Poets was a series of reprints of classic works of literature, first begun in 1830 by English bookseller and publisher William Pickering and printer Charles Whittingham. The books were relatively cheap, and the Aldine Poets series was one of the first and, according to Richard Altick, "the most memorable classic-reprint series of the period".
