= Helen Atteridge =

- Born: 1856; South Pacific Ocean
- Died: 23 February 1931 (aged 74–75); London
- Occupation: Writer, poet
- Relatives: Andrew Hilliard Atteridge

Helen Atteridge (1856 – 23 February 1931) was an Irish poet and young adult author.

Helen Atteridge was born in 1856 in the South Pacific Ocean, the daughter of ship captain John Atteridge and Ellen Maria Hilliard. Her brother was Andrew Hillard Atteridge, editor of the Catholic Times.

Atteridge published works of poetry and religious fiction and contributed to Catholic periodicals. Three of her sonnets were included in the Catholic poetry collection Carmina Mariana: An English Anthology in Verse in Honour of or in Relation to the Blessed Virgin Mary (1893) by Orby Shipley.

Helen Atteridge died on 23 February 1931 in London.

== Bibliography ==
1. "Foremost if I Can". 1 vol. London: Cassell, 1886.
2. Bunty and the Boys. 1 vol. London: Cassell, 1888.
3. Butterfly Ballads and Stories in Rhyme. London: J, Milne, 1898.
4. The Bravest of the Brave, and The Story of a Soldier, a Donkey, and a Doll. 1 vol. London: Cassell, 1900.
5. Fluffy and Jack. 1 vol. London: Cassell, 1900.
6. The Mystery of Master Max, and The Shrimps of Shrimpton. 1 vol. London: Cassell, 1900.
7. Dolly's Golden Slippers, and The Queer House Next Door. London: Cassell, 1900.
8. To School and Away. 1 vol. London: Cassell, 1900.
9. Uncle Silvio's Secret. 1 vol. London: Cassell, 1900.
10. At the Sign of the Silver Cup. New York: P. J. Kenedy, 1926.
11. The Old-World House. London: Catholic Truth Society, 1929.
