= Philobiblon Society =

Victorian Bibliographic Society

- Formation: 1853
- Founder: Richard Monckton Milnes, Sylvain van de Weyer
- Dissolved: 1884
- Location: London
- Publication: Biographical and Historical Miscellanies

The Philobiblon Society was a Victorian literary club based in London which existed from 1853 to 1884. It was founded by Richard Monckton Milnes and Sylvain van de Weyer to provide a discussion forum for book collectors, academics and scholars. Over its lifetime the Society produced fifteen volumes of its journal, Biographical and Historical Miscellanies which included new contributions, caches of unpublished material and primary works on history, biography and bibliography.

== Founding document ==
The Philobiblon Society was composed of "persons interested in the history, collection, or peculiarities of Books". There were 35 founding members, and blackball rules were imposed to screen new members. The membership reflected the society's elite and international character.

=== Founders ===
- Richard Monckton Milnes (later 1st Baron Houghton) – Poet, Keats scholar and MP
- Sylvain van de Weyer – Belgian Ambassador and Prime Minister

=== Membership ===
Some of the members:

- Prince Albert – consort of Queen Victoria
- Henri d'Orléans, Duke of Aumale – exiled French prince, major book collector
- Beriah Botfield – MP whose library was among the finest private collections
- Robert Curzon – traveller and manuscript collector, with collections from the Levant (Middle East)
- Lord Delamere – Conservative politician
- Lord Dufferin and Claneboye – diplomat, later Governor General of Canada and Viceroy of India
- Sir Charles Eastlake – painter and art historian, first director of the National Gallery
- Francis Egerton, 1st Earl of Ellesmere – patron of the arts, owner of the Ellesmere Chaucer
- Lieut. Gen. Charles Richard Fox – soldier, coin collector
- Ralph William Grey – MP and civil servant
- Duke of Hamilton and Brandon – owner of important artistic and manuscript collections
- Edward Craven Hawtrey – Provost of Eton

Later members included

- Prince Philippe, Count of Flanders – Belgian prince and brother of King Leopold II
- Prince Aleksey Borisovich Lobanov-Rostovsky – Russian diplomat, manuscript collector
- Thomas Erskine May – constitutional scholar
- Samuel Wilberforce – Bishop of Oxford, prominent churchman

=== Meetings ===
The Duke of Aumale was the main host. Living at Orleans House in Twickenham, he not only providing outstanding meals but also showing quantities of the books he had recently acquired. The "Rules" also say that Members would meet for breakfast once a month from February to July.

=== Subscription fees ===
Members were charged three pounds subscription fees.

=== Motto ===
The group's motto, which appeared on the title page of every edition of the Miscellanies, was

Quis vero de librorum amore principaliter disserit, placuit nobis, more veterum Latinorum, ipsum Graeco vocabulo Philobiblon amabilius nuncupare.

It's the opening sentence of Philobiblon, a celebrated medieval work on the love of books (1345) by Richard de Bury, noted book collector himself. An approximate translation is

"We have chosen to call the love of books by the pleasing Greek name of 'Philobiblon' "

== The Biographical and Historical Miscellanies ==
The Society aimed to print a volume of Bibliographical Miscellanies, "which shall consist of Notices and Analyses of Rare or Curious Books or Manuscripts,— Unpublished Documents and Letters,— Biographical Sketches of Persons connected with Literature, from original sources,— Typographical Curiosities, Illuminations, and Illustrations of Books, and Researches into the Connexion of Literature with the Fine Arts."

As befits its name, the annual Miscellany contained a wide variety of papers from a wide variety of contributors. There are fifteen volumes that have survived, the topics include:

=== Bibliography and collections ===
Members shared detailed accounts of rare books and manuscripts that they had acquired, inherited or hope to acquire. Some presented historical library catalogues (such as episcopal book inventories). Members seem to be often talking about their libraries, or the collections of others. In addition to showing older books, members also debated how far it was appropriate to collect contemporary authors.

=== History ===
Many of the members had interests in history, and so there are lots of studies and primary document collections especially medieval and imperial history, including royal captivities, imperial dispatches, voyages of exploration. Most of the members would have had a deep classical education, so there is much discussion of ancient texts.

=== Biography ===
Biographical notices and collections of previously unpublished personal letters.

=== Miscellany ===
As befits the title, it seems that the members could present anything they had an interest in. For example collections of foreign proverbs, unedited poetry, macro-literature/macaronic poetry, and memoirs/anecdotes. The editor admitted that the miscellaneous character of the Volumes issued was haphazard and they hoped to group them into new Volumes, classified according to subjects, and furnished with new and uniform title-pages and tables.

== Notable contributions ==
Notable contributions included:

- The manuscript of Tennyson's "In Memoriam" was shown by Sir John Simeon.
- There was prolonged discussion about the newly discovered manuscript of Keats's poem "The Fall of Hyperion", which was eventually published, for the first time, in the society's Miscellanies Vol 3.
- Unpublished letters of Samuel Taylor Coleridge are included in Vol 15.
- The Earl of Ellesmere, showed the Ellesmere Chaucer
- Robert Curzon, who had chronicled much of his own collecting of manuscripts in his book Visits to Monasteries in the Levant (1849).
- Aumale discussed the books he had recently acquired, including the renowned Très riches heures of the duc de Berry.

== Printing history ==
The Miscellany was printed by Charles Whittingham, with initial letter wood cuts by engraver Mary Byfield. Whittingham used the "old-style" Caslon font, which features the "long" lower-case "s", or "ſ", more familiar from early modern print. Copies were sent to the British Museum, Oxford & Cambridge University, Trinity College, Dublin and the Advocates Library in Edinburgh.

Early editions were restricted to 100 copies on laid paper (which was expensive).

A collection of the Miscellanies was assembled and reprinted for the Roxburghe Club in 2020.

== Demise ==
The final edition (Vol 15, 1884) lists no new members but the deaths of 34, and two resignations. Apart from Monckton himself (now Lord Houghton) only 4 other members submitted papers.

The Valedictory is somewhat poignant. Monckton laments the decline of his own literary faculty, and the lack of contributions, meaning he was doing most of the writing himself which was not the case with the former volumes.

Monckton believed that the Miscellanies were a valuable addition to historical and bibliographical literature. He acknowledged that other journals ere available, and that the "historical wealth of our great libraries is in process of general distribution through numerous and ready channels of editorial ability". He regretted that "the very privacy which at one time was an attraction has assumed the character of a restriction.

He also regretted the lack of "noble and wealthy entertainers" and that implied "a regrettable diminution of the literary energies and tastes of English social life", he gamely noted that the rival Roxburgh Society, was still succeeding.

Its lifetime coincided with fundamental changes in collecting tastes and in the study of manuscripts and early printing. By 1884 scholarly publication was easier, and public libraries were more accessible. The 1870 Education Act led to a higher level of literacy which meant a broader middle class of readers was now reading and acquiring books, there were many more journals for contributors to publish in.

== Legacy ==
The Society was one of several Victorian literary clubs, like the Roxburghe Club, the Camden Society and the Hakluyt Society which aimed to bring together collectors, scholars and historians. The 15 volumes of the Biographical and Historical Miscellanies preserves a wide range of articles from a broad selection of authors including early publications of manuscripts, letters and texts which were subsequently studied more broadly.
