= Chiswick Press =

British printing press (1811–1962)

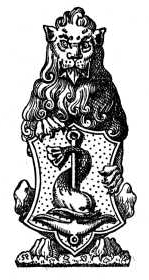
Early trademark of the Chiswick Press

The Chiswick Press was founded by Charles Whittingham I (1767–1840) in 1811. The management of the Press was taken over in 1840 by the founder's nephew Charles Whittingham II (1795–1876). The name was first used in 1811, and the Press continued to operate until 1962. C. Whittingham I gained notoriety for his popularly priced classics, but the Chiswick Press became very influential in English printing and typography under C. Whittingham II who, most notably, published some of the early designs of William Morris. The Chiswick Press deserves conspicuous credit for the reintroduction of quality printing into the trade in England when in 1844 it produced The Diary of Lady Willoughby.

Another notable Chiswick Press publication was The First Six Books of the Elements of Euclid by Oliver Byrne published by William Pickering. The book was printed in the revived Caslon type, and made innovative use of colour yet retained the antiquarian style associated with the Press at the time, It also had decorated capitals by engraver and illustrator Mary Byfield. similar to those found in medieval illustrated manuscripts.

== History ==
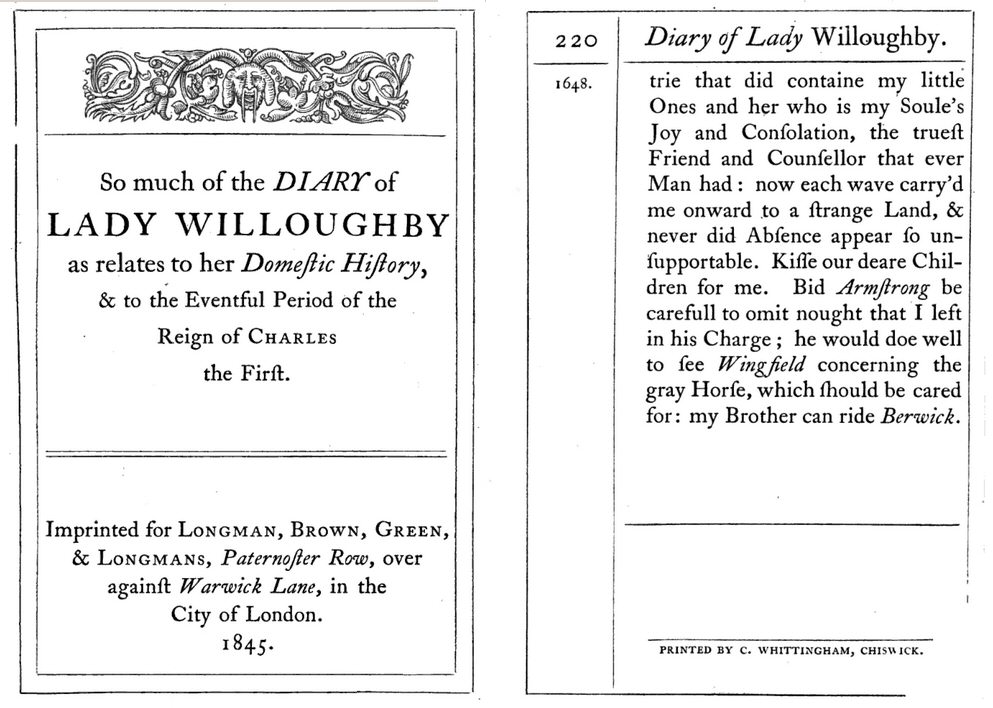
Title page and last page of The Diary of Lady Willoughby, 1845, printed to resemble a book of the period of Charles I by Whittingham's Chiswick Press

The typeface Basle Roman was cut for the Chiswick Press in 1854 by William Howard and cast at his foundry in Great Queen Street. It was first used for the Rev. William Calvert's The Wife's Manual (a book of religious verse), published in 1854; later editions followed in 1856 and 1861, both set in the same type which apparently had only one size, 10-11 pt and no italic. The Basle roman is a type based on the kind of roman type used by Johannes Froben of Basle in the early 16th century. In 1889 it was used by William Morris for his romance A Tale of the House of the Wolfings, and again for The Roots of the Mountains (dated 1890 but appeared the year before). The volumes of religious verse by the Rev. Orby Shipley also used Basle roman: Lyra eucharistica (1863), Lyra messianica (1864) and Lyra mystica (1865).

After William Morris's Kelmscott Press closed, leftover paper and the type fonts were given to the Chiswick Press.
