= The Bodley Head =

British publishing company

- Parent company: Penguin Random House
- Founded: 1887; 139 years ago
- Founders: John Lane and Elkin Mathews
- Country of origin: United Kingdom
- Headquarters location: London
- Publication types: Books
- Official website: penguin.co.uk/company/publishers/vintage/bodley-head.html

The Bodley Head is an English book publishing imprint of Penguin Random House. Founded in 1887 by John Lane and Elkin Mathews, The Bodley Head existed as an independent entity or as part of multiple consortia until it was acquired by Random House in 1987 alongside sister companies Jonathan Cape and Chatto & Windus. Random House used The Bodley Head as a children's book imprint until April 2008, when it was repositioned as an adult non-fiction imprint within the Vintage Books division.

The Bodley Head launched Penguin Books as an imprint in 1935, which John Lane spun off as an independent company the following year. The Bodley Head acquired several other imprints prior to the Random House acquisition, including Martin Hopkinson and Gerald Howe in 1941, Nonesuch Press in 1953, Werner Laurie in 1957, and Hollis & Carter in 1962.

== History ==
Originally named Elkin Mathews and John Lane, The Bodley Head was a partnership set up in 1887 by booksellers Elkin Mathews and John Lane, initially to trade in antiquarian books in London. It took the name Bodley Head from a bust of Sir Thomas Bodley, the eponymist of the Bodleian Library in Oxford, above the shop door.

Lane and Mathews began in 1894 to publish works of ‘stylish decadence’, including the notorious literary periodical The Yellow Book. Also notable amongst Bodley Head's pre-Great War books were the two-volume sets: Foundations of the Nineteenth Century (1910 and later editions, selling over fifty thousand copies), and Immanuel Kant, both by Houston Stewart Chamberlain. Herbert George Jenkins was a manager at the firm during the first decade of the twentieth century, before leaving to set up his own publishing house in 1912. The Bodley Head became a private company in 1921. In 1926 it published the Book of Bodley Head Verse, an anthology edited by J. B. Priestley. The firm published some popular authors including Arnold Bennett and Agatha Christie and the book series, Twentieth Century Library (edited by V. K. Krishna Menon), but ran into financial difficulties. Allen Lane, John Lane's nephew who had inherited control, left in 1936 to found Penguin Books. Before Allen Lane's new company was established, however, he published the first Penguins in 1935 under the imprint of The Bodley Head. Both "Penguin Books" and "The Bodley Head" appeared on the cover. The Bodley Head continued after 1936 backed by a consortium of Allen & Unwin, Jonathan Cape, and J. M. Dent. In 1941, John Lane the Bodley Head took over two smaller publishing houses, Gerald Howe Ltd and Martin Hopkinson & Co., whose authors included Cecil Day Lewis and H. L. Mencken.

The firm was bought in 1957 by Ansbacher & Co., headed by Max Reinhardt. During this period Bodley Head published the work of authors such as George Bernard Shaw, Graham Greene, Charles Chaplin, William Trevor, Maurice Sendak, Muriel Spark, Alexander Solzhenitsyn, Sam Haskins, Winston Graham and Alistair Cooke. Max Reinhardt was also responsible for the expansion of one of the outstanding children's books lists in modern publishing. The imprint was still important in the 1970s when it was drawn into the Jonathan Cape/Chatto & Windus group. The firm was sold to Random House in 1987, who published children's books under The Bodley Head name until 2008. The archives of The Bodley Head Ltd are kept at Reading University in Reading, England.

== Relaunch ==
The Bodley Head imprint was relaunched by Random House as an adult imprint in April 2008. Its two principal strands are stated to be books "of scholarship in both the humanities and sciences", and books which "contribute to the intellectual and cultural climate of our times".

== See also ==
- Category:The Bodley Head books
- Books in the United Kingdom

== Bibliography ==
- Stetz, Margaret; Lasner, Mark Samuels (1990); England in the 1890s: Literary Publishing at the Bodley Head; Georgetown University Press; ISBN 0-87840-509-7
- J. W. Lambert and Michael Ratcliffe; The Bodley Head 1887–1987 (1987); the story of John Lane, Allen Lane, Unwin and Max Reinhardt and their links with Bodley Head; ISBN 0-370-30949-9
