= Charles Whittingham (1795–1876) =

English printer

Charles Whittingham (1795–1876) was an English printer, a nephew of Charles Whittingham (1767–1840) who took over the Chiswick Press from his uncle.

== Life ==
Whittingham was born at Mitcham, Surrey, on 30 October 1795; his father Samuel Whittingham', brother of the elder Charles, was a nurseryman. Known as "the nephew", he was apprenticed at the age of fifteen to his uncle, who had paid for his education under the Rev. John Evans of Islington. He was made a freeman of the Company of Stationers in 1817, and the following year his uncle sent him to Paris with letters of introduction to the Didots. One result of the visit was the production on his return of Whittingham's French Classics by the Chiswick Press; a series of Pocket Novels was also issued under his supervision. In 1824 his uncle took him into partnership, then dissolved in 1828, and the younger Whittingham started a printing office at 21 Took's Court, Chancery Lane. Through Basil Montagu he came to know William Pickering, the bookseller, who was to be a lifelong friend and associate.

On the death of his uncle in 1840 the Chiswick Press business passed into the hands of the younger Whittingham. He carried on the works at Chiswick as well as at Took's Court until 1848, and the books printed at both places bore the imprint of Chiswick Press. In 1848 he became a liveryman of the Company of Stationers. The lease at Took's Court expired in 1849, and for three years all his printing was carried on at Chiswick. In 1852 he returned to the premises at Took's Court.

In 1854 Whittingham lost his wife and his friend Pickering, and in 1860 took his manager John Wilkins (died 1869), into partnership, and retired from active work. The business later passed to the publisher George Bell.

Whittingham died on 21 April 1876. He was buried in Kensal Green cemetery next to William Pickering.

== Works ==
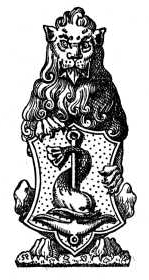
Early Trademark of the Chiswick Press

The two Whittinghams printed Knickerbocker's New York (1824), Pierce Egan's Life of an Actor (1825), Samuel Weller Singer's Shakespeare in ten volumes (1825), and other books. The younger Whittingham's first solo work, A Sunday Book, was dated 1829, and followed by George Peele's Works (1829), The Bijou, or Annual of Literature and the Arts, The Compleat Angler, the Canterbury Tales, Francis Bacon's Works, and Holbein's Dance of Death. Some books illustrated by George and Robert Cruikshank came from Took's Court between 1830 and 1833.

With Pickering, Whittingham had many woodcut initial letters and ornaments designed or adapted. In 1840 he began block colour printing in Henry Shaw's Elizabethan Architecture, published in 1842. Pickering issued from his new premises at 177 Piccadilly in 1841 a prayer-book, one of the first of the ornamental volumes printed for him by Whittingham. Samuel Rogers came to the Chiswick Press for the Notes to his Italy (1843).

The years 1843 and 1844 marked the introduction of the antiquarian style of book production, for which Whittingham and Henry Cole were mainly responsible. In 1843 Whittingham had the Caslon Foundry revive an old face font of great primer cut in 1720, with an Eton prize Juvenal for Pickering and the Diary of Lady Willoughby for Longman printed in it. He printed Pickering's reproductions of the first editions of the Book of Common Prayer in 1844. Among the later works were the volumes of the Philobiblon Society, Lord Vernon's Dante (1854), and the Brevarium Aberdonense (1854).

Antiquarian-style border by Whittingham from The First Six Books of the Elements of Euclid

A notable example of Wittingham's antiquarian design was The First Six Books of the Elements of Euclid by Oliver Byrne, published by William Pickering in 1847. It uses the Calson typeface, and antiquarian-style borders. The production included decorated capitals similar to those in mediaeval illustrated manuscripts, by engraver and illustrator Mary Byfield.

== Family ==
Whittingham married, in 1826, Eleanor Hulley (died 1854) of Nottingham. They had five children—William, Charlotte, Elizabeth Eleanor, Jane, and Charles John—all of whom were connected with the Chiswick Press, the daughters involving themselves in the literary and artistic departments. Elizabeth died in 1867. Charlotte married Benjamin Franklin Stevens in 1865; he was a partner in the Chiswick Press from January 1872 to August 1876. Charlotte and Elizabeth trained as artists, and worked on borders, monograms, head and tail pieces, and other embellishments. The engraver of most of the ornamental wood-blocks was Mary Byfield (died 1871).

== Notes ==
Attribution

This article incorporates text from a publication now in the public domain: Lee, Sidney, ed. (1900). "Whittingham, Charles (1795-1876)". Dictionary of National Biography. Vol. 61. London: Smith, Elder & Co.
