= Whittingham (surname) =

Whittingham is a surname. Notable people with the surname include:

- Alexandra Whittingham, classical guitarist and educator
- Barrie Whittingham (born 1940), English cricketer
- Bob Whittingham, English footballer
- Byron Whittingham (1870–1942), American politician
- Charles Whittingham, English printer
- Charles Whittingham (1795–1876), English printer and nephew of the above
- Charlie Whittingham, American thoroughbred race horse trainer
- Guy Whittingham, professional footballer
- Fred Whittingham, American football player and coach
- Jack Whittingham, British playwright, film critic, and screenwriter
- Ken Whittingham, American TV director
- Kyle Whittingham, American football head coach
- M. Stanley Whittingham, chemist
- Peter Whittingham (1984–2020), English footballer
- Sam Whittingham, Canadian cyclist
- Samuel Ford Whittingham (1772–1841), British officer of the Napoleonic Wars
- William Whittingham (c. 1524–1579), English Biblical scholar and religious reformer
- William Rollinson Whittingham (1805–1879), 4th Episcopal bishop of Maryland

Fictional characters:

- Professor Richard Whittingham, character from the BBC Radio 4 comedy series Old Harry's Game
