= Werner Oechslin =

Swiss historian and author (born 1944)

Werner Oechslin (born 1944) is a Swiss historian and author.

== Life ==
He was born in 1944.

He studied art history, archeology, philosophy and mathematics in Zurich and Rome.

== Career ==
Since 1985, he has been a professor of history at the Swiss Federal Institute of Technology.

He is a founder of the Werner Oechslin Library.

== Bibliography ==
His notable books are:

- Festival Architecture Rome
- Byrne: Six Books of Euclid
- Otto Wagner, Adolf Loos, and the Road to Modern Architecture
- Alberto Camenzind: Architect
