= Orby Shipley =

English clergyman (1832 - 1916)

Orby Shipley (July 1, 1832 – July 5, 1916) was an English clergyman, editor, liturgist, translator, publisher, and hymn-writer. An Anglo-Catholic convert to Roman Catholicism from the Church of England, he had been a priest of the Society of the Holy Cross before his conversion. Shipley served at St Thomas the Martyr's Church, Oxford and St Alban's Church, Holborn as an Anglican priest. Shipley and his wife became Roman Catholics in 1878.

== Works ==
- Eucharistic Litanies from Ancient Sources 1860
- Lyra Eucharistica: Hymns and Verses on the Holy Communion, Ancient and Modern with Other Poems 1864
- Lyra Mystica: Hymns and Verses on Sacred Subjects, Ancient and Modern 1865
- Six Short Sermons on Sin: Lent Lectures at S. Alban the Martyr, Holborn 1868
- Of the Establishment of an Oratory in London by the Society of the Holy Cross 1870
- A Glossary of Ecclesiastical Forms 1871
- Annus Sanctus: Hymns of the Church for the Ecclesiastical Year, 1885
- Carmina Mariana: An English Anthology in Verse in Honour of or in Relation to the Blessed Virgin Mary 1893

== See also ==
Chiswick Press
