= Charles Whittingham (priest) =

Charles Whittingham (1664–1743) was an Anglican priest.

Whittingham was educated at Trinity College, Dublin. He received the degree of Doctor of Divinity (DD). He was Archdeacon of Dublin from 1719 until his death. During his tenure St Peter, Dublin was united perpetually to the archdeaconry.
