= Oliver Byrne (mathematician) =

Irish engineer & author (1810–1880)

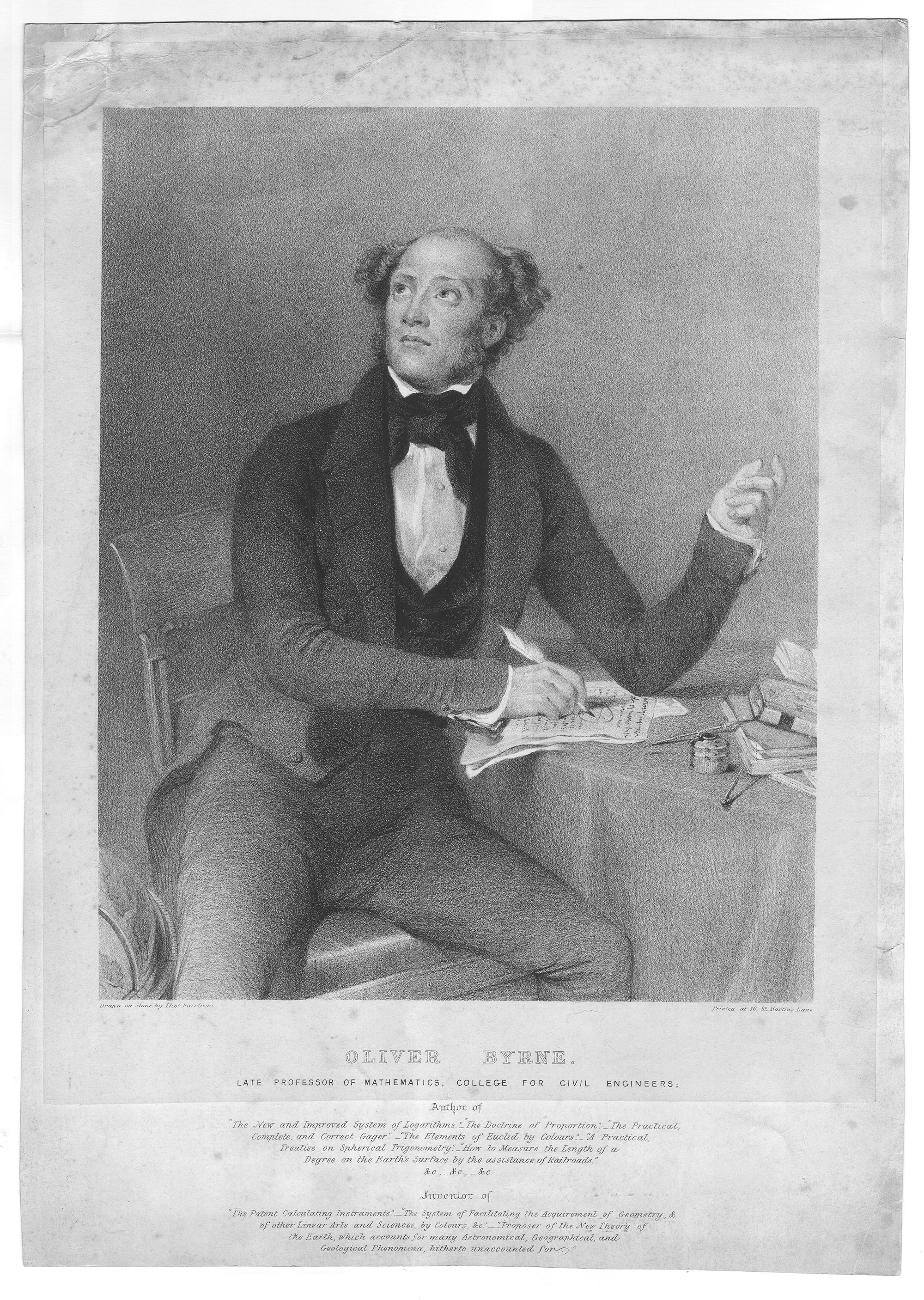
- Lithograph of Oliver Byrne
- Born: 31 July 1810; Avoca, County Wicklow, Ireland
- Died: 9 December 1880 (aged 70); Maidstone, Kent, England
- Known for: His 'coloured' book of Euclid's Elements

Oliver Byrne (/bɜːrn/; 31 July 1810 – 9 December 1880) was a civil engineer and prolific author of works on subjects including mathematics, geometry, and engineering. He is best known for his 'coloured' book of Euclid's Elements, The First Six Books of the Elements of Euclid. He was also a large contributor to Spon's Dictionary of Engineering.

Proof of the Pythagorean theorem. Elements of Euclid Book I, page 48

Proof of the Pythagorean theorem. Elements of Euclid Book I, page 49

== Family and early life ==
Byrne reports the Vale of Avoca, County Wicklow, Ireland as his birthplace. The son of Lawrence Oliver Byrne and Mary Byrne, he had a younger brother John who co-authored a book with him. Little is known about his childhood. He emerges in Dublin at age 20 with his first publication. By the age of 29, Byrne was noted as the "principal support of an aged mother and sisters in Ireland." Later in England, he was appointed Professor of Mathematics in the College for Civil Engineers at Putney.

== Marriage ==
His wife Eleanor (née Rugg), was 12 years younger than Oliver and published meteorological articles and books. She is featured on a token struck to commemorate Oliver Byrne's invention of Byrneore, a metal alloy intended to look similar to gold and silver.

== Byrne's Euclid ==
Byrne's Elements

His most innovative educational work was a version of Euclid's Elements that used coloured graphic explanations of each geometric principle. It was published by William Pickering in 1847.

The book has become the subject of renewed interest in recent years for its innovative graphic conception and its style which prefigures the modernist experiments of the Bauhaus and De Stijl movements. Information design writer Edward Tufte refers to the book in his work on graphic design and McLean in his Victorian book design of 1963. In 2010 Taschen republished the work in a facsimile edition and in 2017 a project was launched to extend the work to the remaining works of Euclid.

Byrne described himself as a mathematician, civil engineer, military engineer, and mechanical engineer and indicates on the title pages of one of his books that he was surveyor of Queen Victoria's settlement in the Falkland Islands. Evidence shows Byrne never traveled to the Falkland Islands.

The U.S. Library of Congress has a steel-engraved portrait of Oliver Byrne.

== Engineering and inventions ==
Byrne engaged in numerous railroad projects and invented mechanical devices including the following:

- The Byrnegraph
- The Gauger's Patent Calculating Instruments.

In 1842, Oliver Byrne and Henry William Hull (BA, CE) made a proposal for a School of Mathematics, Engineering, Classics, and General Literature at Surrey Villa, near Lambeth Palace.

Byrne was an anti-phrenologist, and wrote a book on the fallacy of phrenology.

== Irish independence ==
In 1853 while residing in the US, Oliver Byrne wrote a book titled Freedom to Ireland, published in Boston. The book advocates Irish revolt against British rule and outlining house and street fighting, handling of small arms, etc. Oliver toured the United States providing lessons in the use of small arms, field fortifications, pike exercises and street fighting. Freedom to Ireland was dedicated 'To the memory of William Byrne, Esq., of Ballymanus, County Wicklow, Ireland,' and to the effusive list of qualities attributed to the dedicatee was the rather dubious claim that Billy 'by the dextrous use of the Pike destroyed two thousand of his country's enemy; and out of twenty-seven engagements in the open field, won twenty-one. In the preface to one of his books, Oliver Byrne has the following dedication:

TO THE MEMORY OF WILLIAM BYRNE, ESQ;, OF BALLYMANUS, COUNTY WICKLOW, IRELAND, WHO WAS EXECUTED FOR FIDELITY AND LOYALTY TO HIS COUNTRY IN 1798 THIS WORK IS DEDICATED. BYRNE WAS A MAN OF LARGE FORTUNE AND ESTATES, OF RARE COURAGE, AND GREAT MILITARY SKILL, AND OF MUCH PERSONAL STRENGTH AND BEAUTY; HE DID NOT LOSE HIS LIFE AND ESTATES, OR BETRAY HIS COUNTRY, BY MAKING LONG SPEECHES TO TEACH THE ENEMY. HE WAS NOT ONE OF THE BEGARRLY BRIEFLASS SPOUTING POLITICAL TRICKSTER HUMBUGS; NO, BUT ONE WHO IN CONJUNCTION WITH HIS BROTHER GARRET BYRNE AND COUSIN MICHAEL DWYER, LED ON HIS COUNTRYMEN, AND BY THE DEXTERIOUS USE OF THE PIKE, DESTROYED 2000 OF HIS COUNTRY'S ENEMY; AND OUT OF 27 ENGAGEMENTS IN THE OPEN FIELD, WON TWENTY ONE....etc.

The United Irishmen (who consisted of Protestants and Catholics alike) and the Irish Home Rule Association, both supported by Byrne, declared their belief in a peaceful future for Ireland in which Protestants and Catholics could live together in peace and with equality.

== Death ==
Byrne died aged 70, on 9 December 1880 of bronchial pneumonia, in Maidstone, Kent, and is buried in Maidstone (Sutton Road) Cemetery, Kent, England.
