= William Pickering (publisher) =

English publisher and bookseller

William Pickering (2 April 1796 – 27 April 1854) was an English publisher and bookseller, notable for various innovations in publishing. He is sometimes credited with introducing edition binding in cloth to British publishing.

== Life and career ==
Pickering served an apprentice in the booktrade between 1810 and 1817, then worked for several booksellers before establishing his own business as an antiquarian bookseller and publisher in 1820. In the same year he began publishing a series of "Diamond Classics", miniature books set in tiny type that were offered in a uniform binding of paper (later cloth) or leather. These are often said to be the first publishers' bindings in cloth, but it is likely that Pickering was one among several publishers who began binding their books in cloth at this period, an innovation which owed its origins to the bookbinder Archibald Leighton, and had a rapid and profound impact on the publishing industry.

Pickering also published original books: from 1828 he became Samuel Taylor Coleridge's publisher, as well as bringing out the first typographical edition of William Blake's Songs of Innocence and of Experience. He specialised in scholarly editions of classic authors, both of ancient and English literature, including important editions of Blake, Malthus, Boswell, Johnson, Marlowe, Shakespeare and Isaac Walton.

In 1833 Pickering purchased a share in the Gentleman's Magazine, and started a new series in January 1834. He chose as its editor the clergyman John Mitford, known for his writings on old English poets and on sacred poetry. Mitford continued to edit the magazine successfully until the end of 1850.

Pickering launched a 57-volume series of the British poets; Mitford did much of the editing. This was named the Aldine Edition of the British Poets; the books were printed by Charles Whittingham. The series was named after the Aldine Press founded in Venice in 1494. Some of the poets were:

- William Cowper, 1830, 3 vols. (memoir written by John Bruce in 1865 edit.);
- Oliver Goldsmith, 1831;
- John Milton, 1832, 3 vols., with sonnet to Charles Sumner;
- John Dryden, 1832–3, 5 vols. (life rewritten by the Rev. Richard Hooper in the 1865 and 1866 editions);
- Thomas Parnell, 1833 and 1866 (with epistle in verse to Alexander Dyce);
- Jonathan Swift, 1833–4, 3 vols., and 1866;
- Edward Young, 1834, 2 vols. (with sonnet), 1858 and 1866;
- Matthew Prior, 1835, 2 vols., 1866;
- Samuel Butler, 1835, 2 vols. (with verses to William Lisle Bowles), 1866;
- William Falconer, 1836, 1866 (with sonnet);
- Edmund Spenser, 1839, 5 vols. (with four sonnets, re-edited by John Payne Collier in 1866).

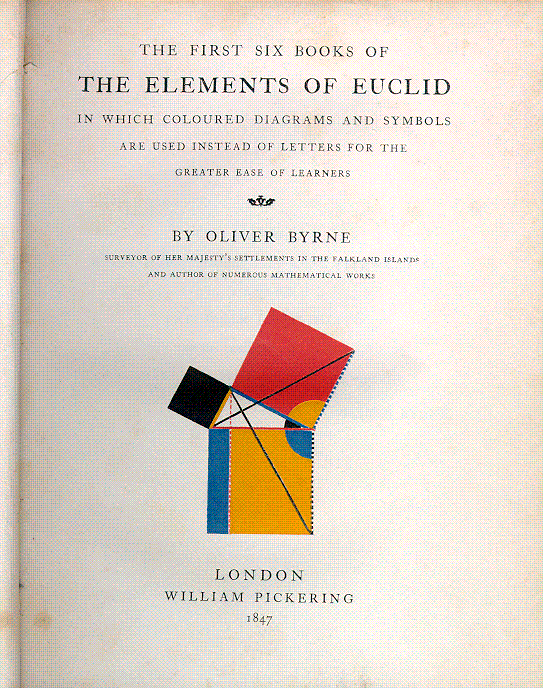
Pickering's printing of Oliver Byrne's The First Six Books of the Elements of Euclid (1847)

One of Pickering's most ambitious projects was The First Six Books of the Elements of Euclid (1847) by Oliver Byrne. This used colour to explain the thorems in Euclid's Elements. The volume cost 25 shillings at a time when a comparable edition in black and white would have been about 5 shillings. It met with limited success at the time of printing, and Wittingham was left with three-quarters of the run as unsold stock. The book has recently become noted for its use of coloured diagrams and symbols in place of the usual letters.

Pickering died shortly after being declared bankrupt in 1853, which resulted in the sale by auction of his extensive stock of books and personal library. His publishing business was later revived by his son, Basil Montagu Pickering; on his death, in 1878, it was purchased by ‘old Mr Chatto’, one of the founding partners of Chatto and Windus and became Pickering and Chatto, a name which survives today in two (now separate) companies: the academic publisher Pickering & Chatto (Publishers) and the antiquarian bookseller of the same name.

== Book series published ==
- Aldine Poets
- Bridgewater Treatises
- Diamond Classics
- Oxford English Classics
- Pickering's Christian Classics
