= Charles Whittingham =

English printer (1767–1840)

- Born: June 16, 1767
- Died: January 5, 1840 (aged 72)
- Occupation: Printer

Charles Whittingham (16 June 1767 – 5 January 1840) was an English printer.

== Biography ==
He was born in Caludon, Warwickshire, the son of a farmer, and was apprenticed to a Coventry printer and bookseller. In 1789 he set up a small printing press in a garret off Fleet Street, London, with a loan obtained from the Caslon Type Foundry, and, by 1797, his business had so increased that he was enabled to move into larger premises.

An edition of Gray's Poems, printed by him in 1799, secured him the patronage of all the leading publishers. Whittingham inaugurated the idea of printing cheap, handy editions of standard authors, and, on the bookselling trade threatening not to sell his productions, took a room at a coffee house and sold them by auction himself.

In 1809, he started a paper-pulp factory at Chiswick, near London, and in 1811 founded the Chiswick Press. From 1810 to 1815 he devoted his chief attention to illustrated books and is credited with having been the first to use proper overlays in printing woodcuts, as he was the first to print a fine, or "Indian Paper" edition. He was one of the first to use a steam engine in a pulp mill, but his presses he preferred to have worked by hand. He died at Chiswick.

His nephew Charles Whittingham (1795–1876), who from 1824 to 1828 had been in partnership with his uncle, in 1838 assumed control of the business. He already had printing works at Took's Court, Chancery Lane, London, and had printed various notable books, especially devoting himself to the introduction of ornamental initial letters, and the artistic arrangement of the printed page. The imprint of the Chiswick press was now placed on the productions of the Took's Court as well as of the Chiswick works, and in 1852 the whole business was removed to London. Under the management of the younger Whittingham, the Chiswick Press achieved a considerable reputation. He died on 21 April 1876.
