= History of graphic design =

Graphic design is the practice of combining text with images and concepts, most often for advertisements, publications, or websites. The history of graphic design is frequently traced from the onset of moveable-type printing in the 15th century, yet earlier developments and technologies related to writing and printing can be considered as parts of the longer history of communication.

== History of graphic design ==
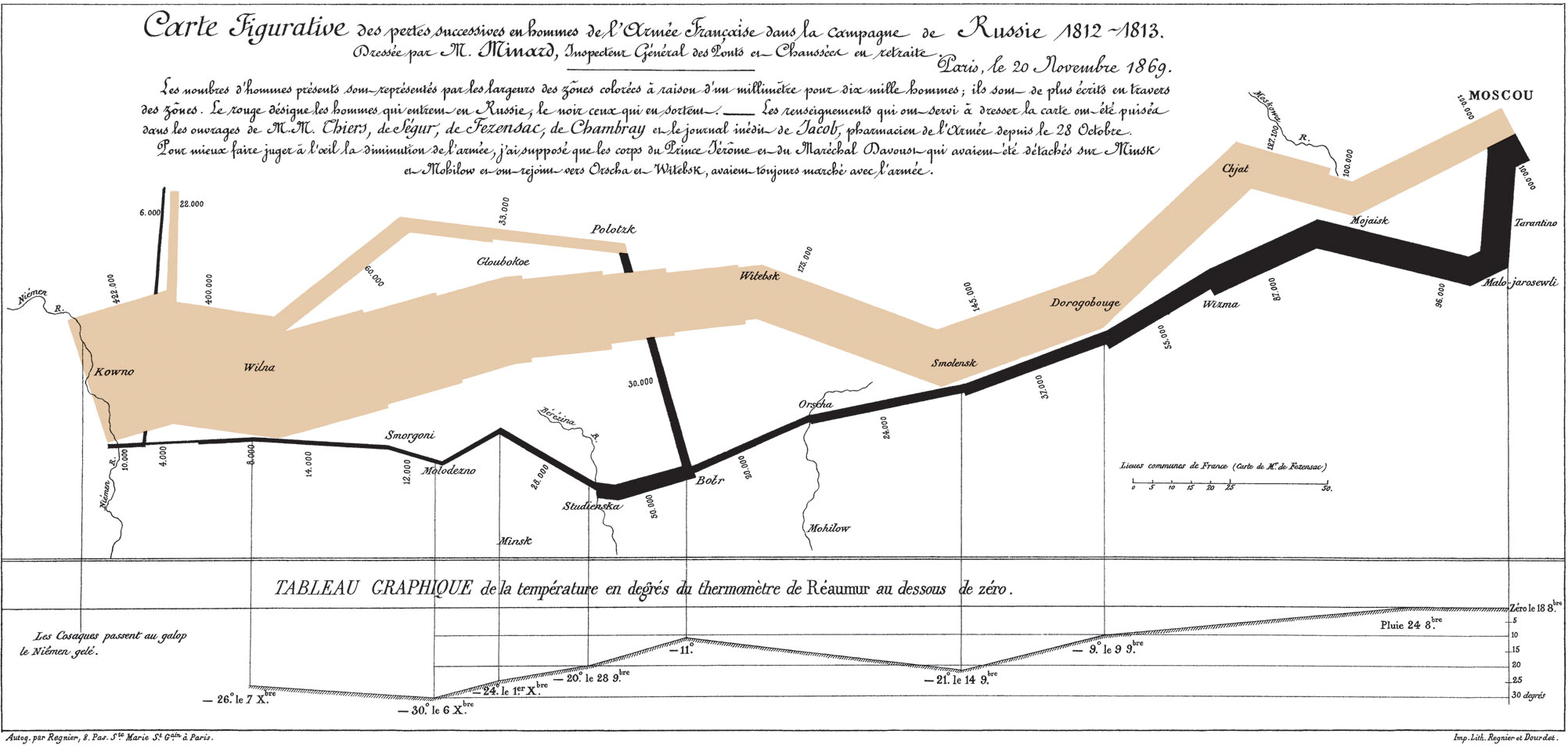
Professor Edward Tufte described Charles Joseph Minard's 1869 graphic of Napoleon's French invasion of Russia as potentially "the best statistical graphic ever drawn", noting it captures 6 variables in 2 dimensions.

Graphic design, with its roots in early visual communication, dates back to prehistoric times, where symbolic and geometric designs were created in caves, such as those in Blombos Cave around 70,000 BCE and the Chauvet Cave around 30,000 BCE. Other early examples also come from Ancient Chinese woodblock prints and Egyptian hieroglyphics. During the Middle Ages, graphic design developed to preserve sacred texts, with scribes using detailed layouts and advanced lettering. In Islamic culture, calligraphy became a unifying visual art form, appreciated for its creativity. The invention of the printing press by Johannes Gutenberg advanced graphic design, which gained significant prominence during the Western Industrial Revolution and the rise of consumer culture and advertising in the 1800s.

During the Industrial Revolution (1760–1840), technologies like lithography improved manufacturing efficiency. Lithography involved transferring inked designs onto paper from stone or metal surfaces, leading to chromolithography, which added color to the process. In response to industrialization, the Wiener Werkstätte, founded in 1903 by Koloman Moser, Josef Hoffmann, and Fritz Waerndorfer, promoted handcrafted design and personal expression. Their modernist style, featuring clean lines and geometric shapes, greatly influenced 20th-century design.

The 19th and 20th centuries saw the rise of significant design movements like Art Nouveau, Art Deco, and Bauhaus, alongside the creation of iconic logos, such as Coca-Cola’s, which shaped modern branding. The digital age, beginning in the 1970s with the development of computer-generated imagery (CGI) and digital design tools, transformed graphic design further. The rise of digital tools revolutionized graphic design, especially with the launch of Apple’s Macintosh in 1984, which encouraged users to become creators with its simple interface.

In the 1990s, Photoshop became popular for graphic editing, making professional design accessible to all, along with basic programs like Microsoft Paint. Digital advancements allowed for effects like transparency, scaling, and intricate montages. A notable example is a 1998 U.S. postage stamp, where designers blended images of Frederick Law Olmsted’s portrait, Central Park, and botanical illustrations to honor the landscape architect’s legacy.

By the 2000s, the advent of portable devices expanded design into web design, UX/UI, and interactive design. As technology continues to advance, graphic design remains dynamic, focusing increasingly on personalized and interactive user experiences.

== Early Visual Communication ==
=== Writing ===
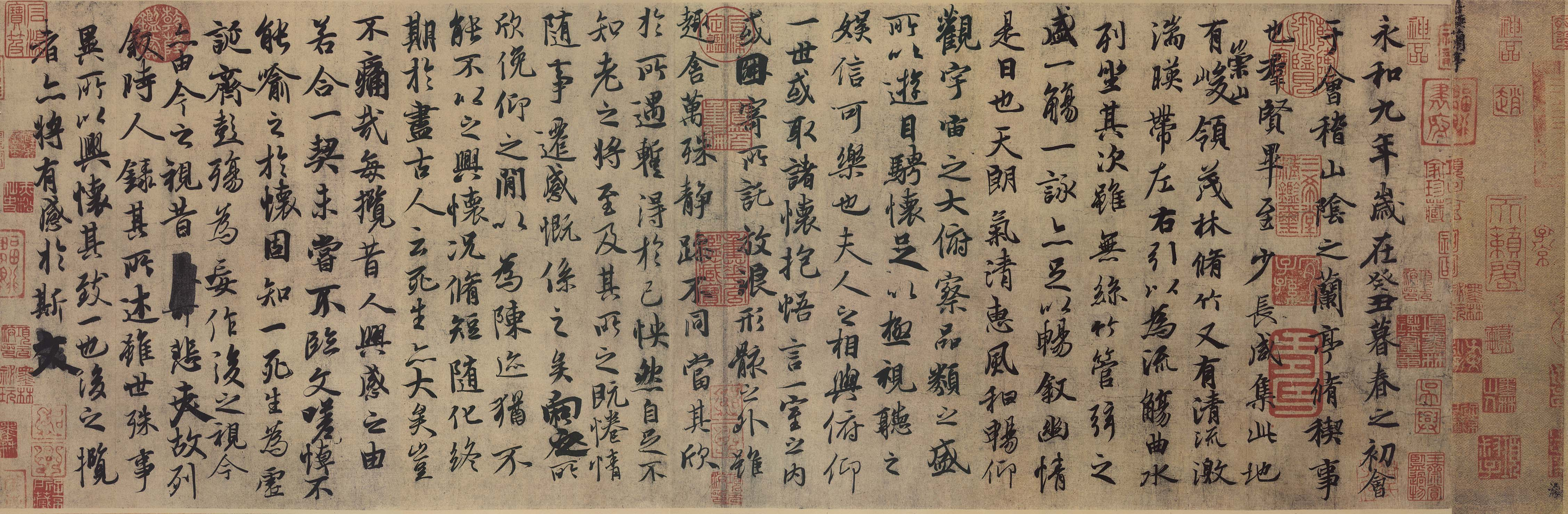
The Lantingji Xu, Preface to the Poems Composed at the Orchid Pavilion, is the most famous work of Chinese calligrapher Wang Xizhi, created in the year 353. (Note: "This calligraphy describes a gathering of 42 poets including Xie An and Sun Chuo at the Orchid Pavilion near Shaoxing, Zhejiang, during the Spring Purification Festival to compose poems and enjoy the wine. The poets had agreed to participate in a drinking contest: wine cups were floated down a small winding creek as the men sat along its banks; whenever a cup stopped, the man closest to the cup was required to drink it and write a poem. In the end, twenty-six of the participants composed thirty-seven poems.")

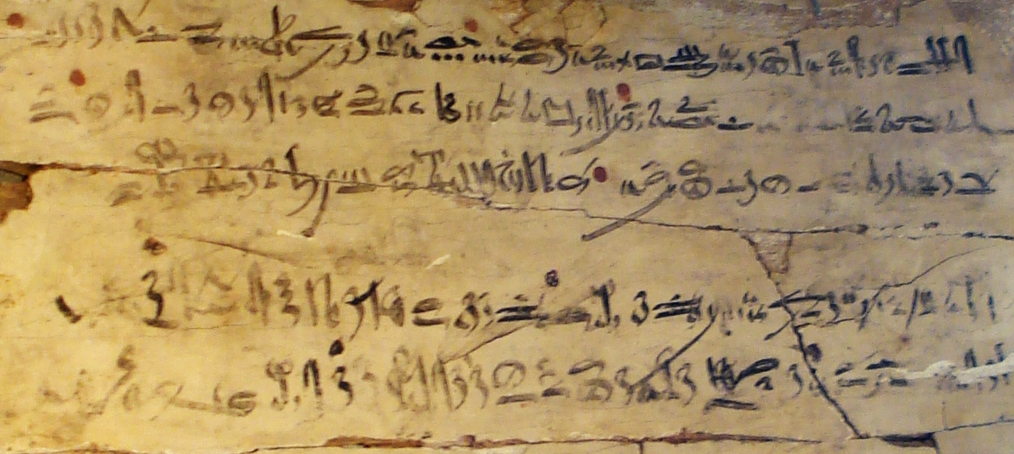
Scribe's exercise tablet with hieratic text on wood, related to Dynasty XVIII, reign of Amenhotep I, c. 1514-1493 BC. Text is an excerpt from The Instructions of Amenemhat II (Dynasty XII), and reads: "Be on your guard against all who are subordinate to you ... Trust no brother, know no friend, make no intimates."

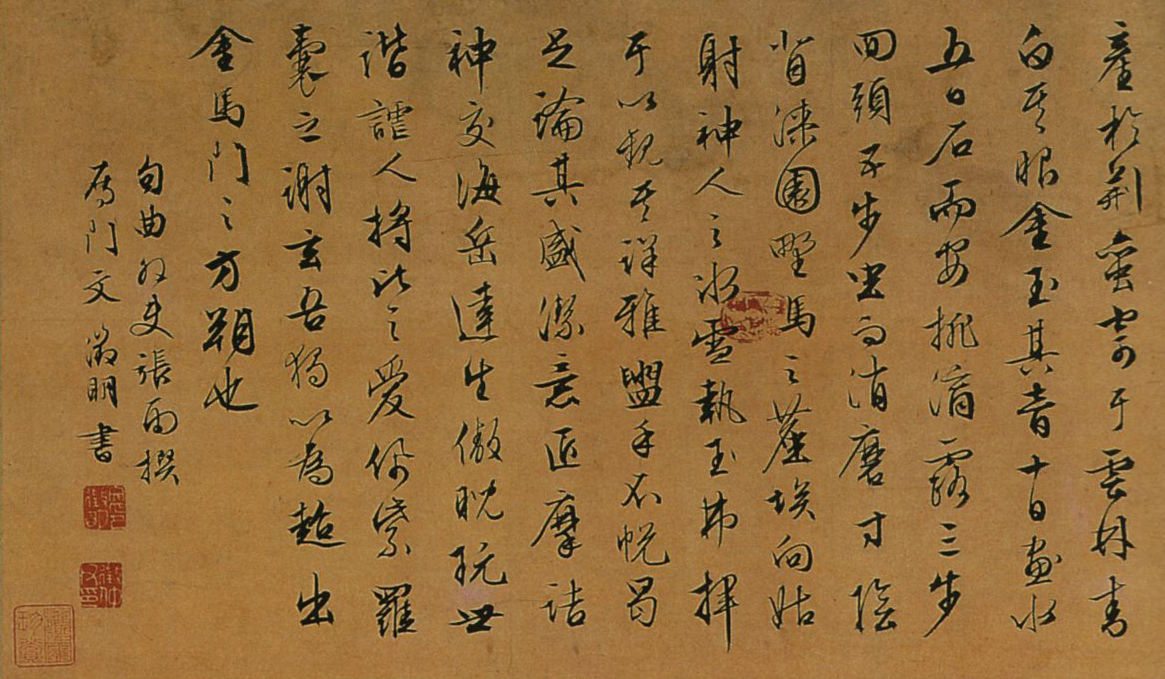
A Chinese traditional title epilogue written by Wen Zhengming in Ni Zan's portrait by Qiu Ying (1470–1559).

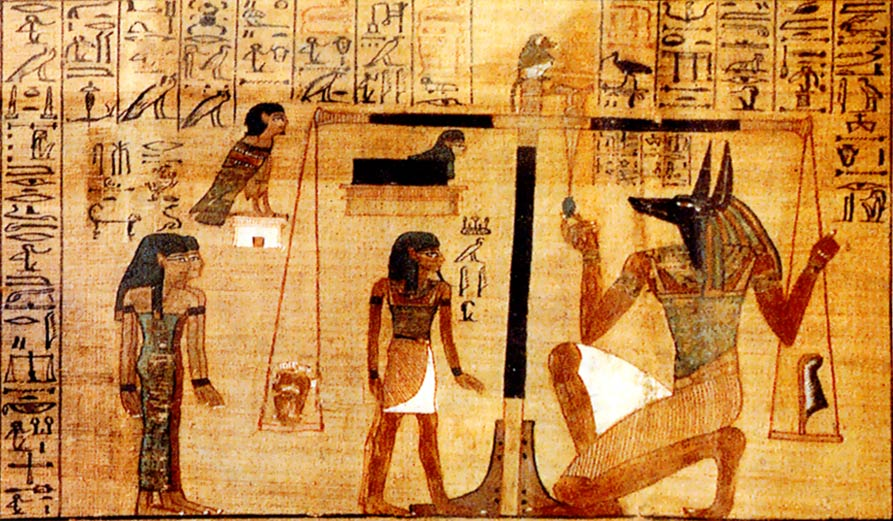
The Papyrus of Ani is a version of the Book of the Dead for the Scribe Ani. This vignette (the small scene that illustrates the text) is about not letting Ani's heart create opposition against him in god's domain.

=== Medieval ===
Medieval religious illuminated manuscripts combine text and images. Among these books are the Gospel books of Insular art, created in the monasteries of the British Isles. The graphics in these books reflect the influence of the Animal style associated with the "barbarian" peoples of Northern Europe, with much use of interlace and geometric decoration.

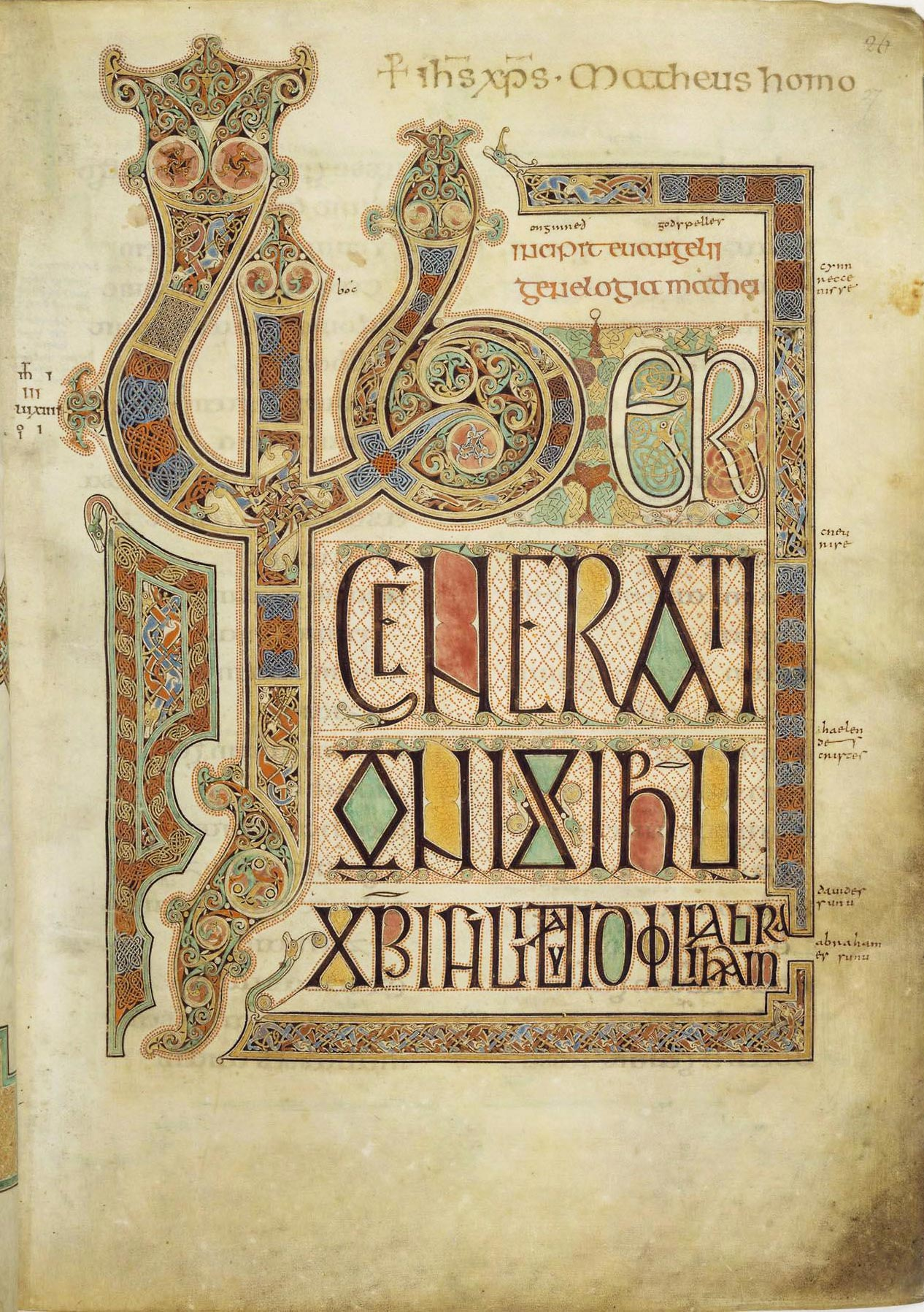
A page from Lindisfarne Gospels, c. 710

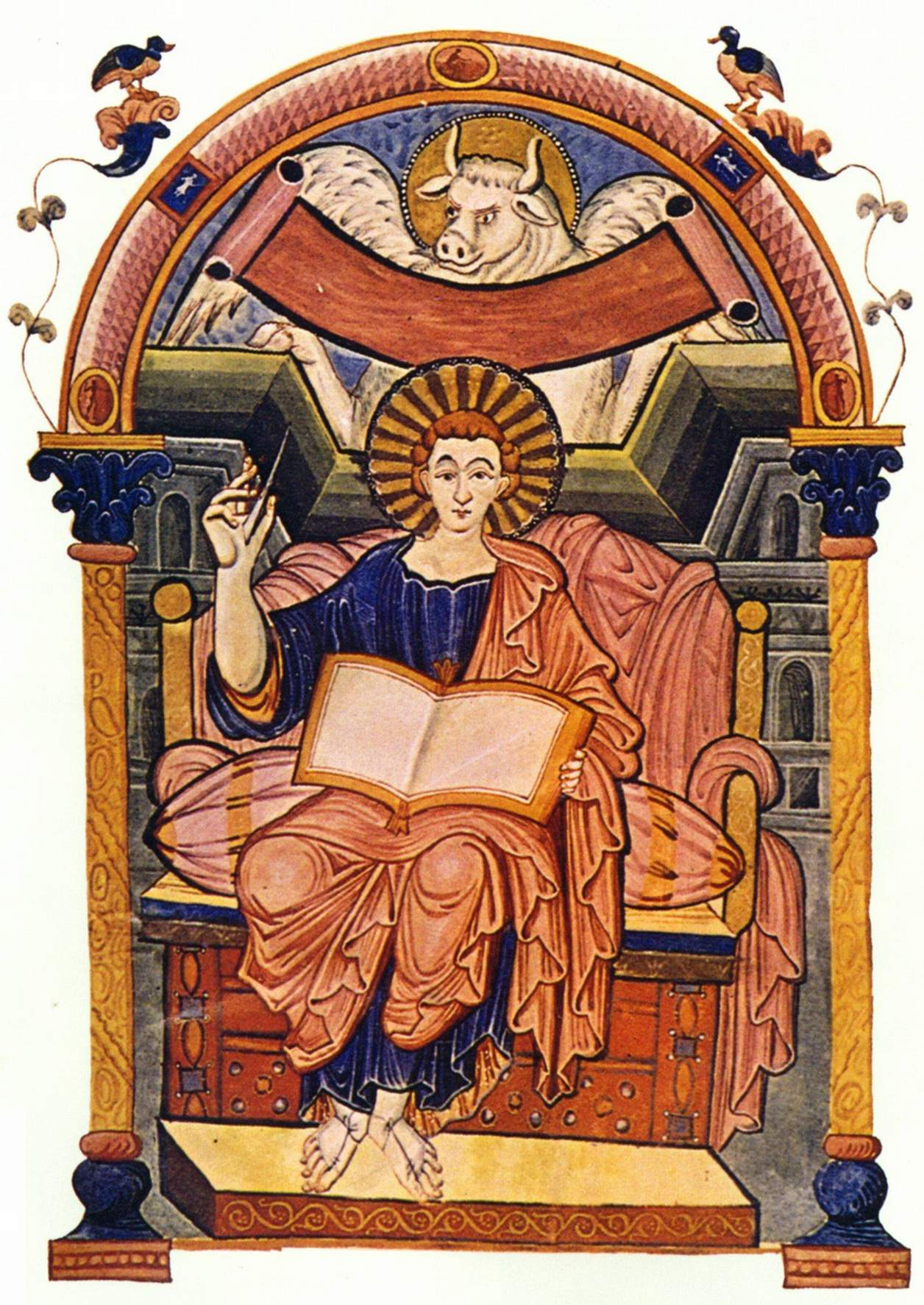
The Ada Gospels are one of a group of manuscripts, known to modern scholars as the Ada School. Its illuminations include an elaborate initial page for the Gospel of Matthew and portraits of Matthew, Mark and Luke. Late 8th century.

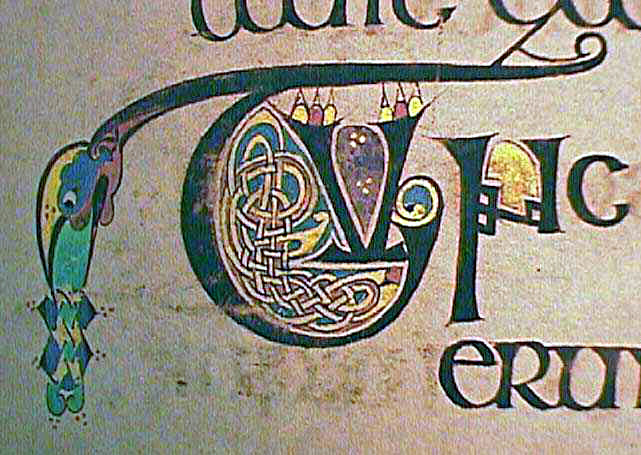
A graphic decoration in the Book of Kells, c. 800

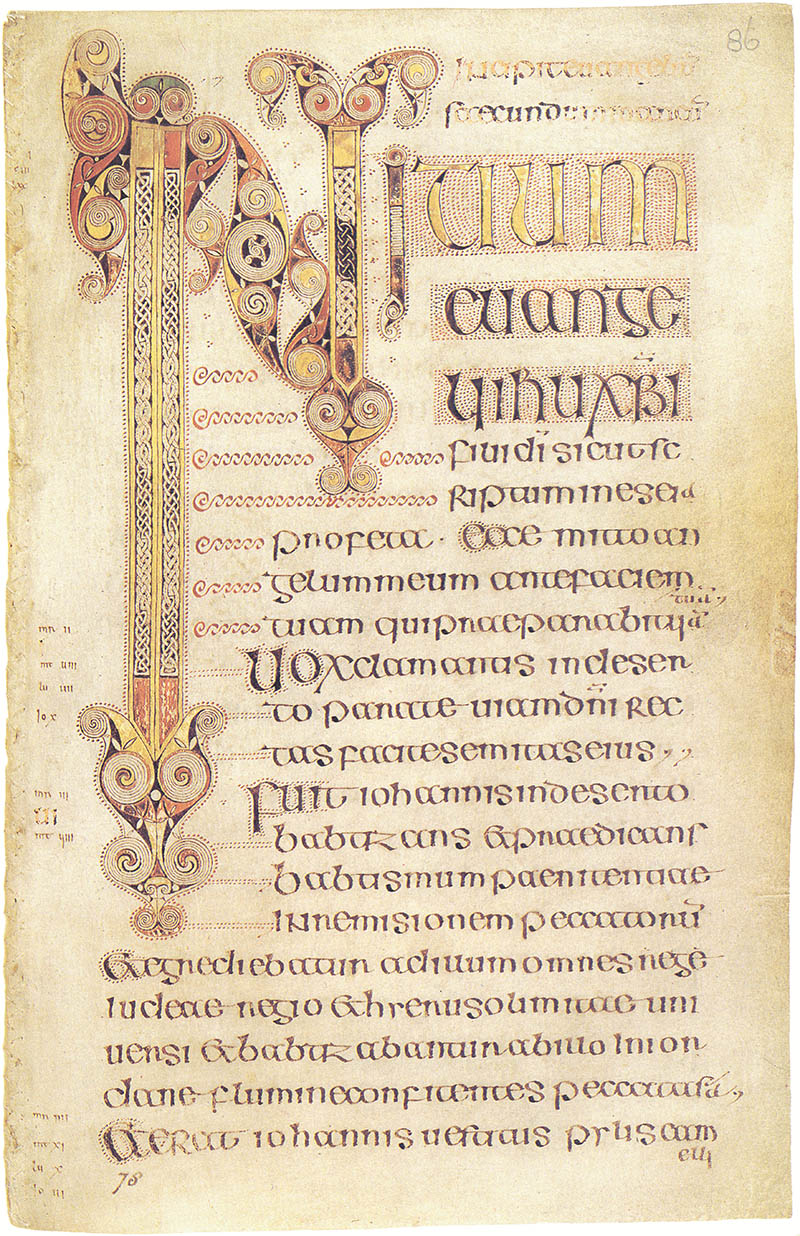
Opening page of Book of Durrow, 7th century

=== The Qur'an ===
In Islamic countries, calligraphy was a sacred aspect of the holy book of Islam, the Quran. Muslim scribes used black ink and golden paper to write and draw, using an angled alphabet called the Kufic script. Such writings appeared in the 8th century and reached their apex in the 10th century. Later, decorations of the margins of pages, displaying a variety of graphic techniques, were added in order to beautify the book. In the 12th century, the Naskh alphabet was invented; it featured curves instead of the angled lines of the Kufic script. Other styles, such as Mohaghegh, Rayhani, Thuluth, Reghaa, and Toghii, appeared later on.

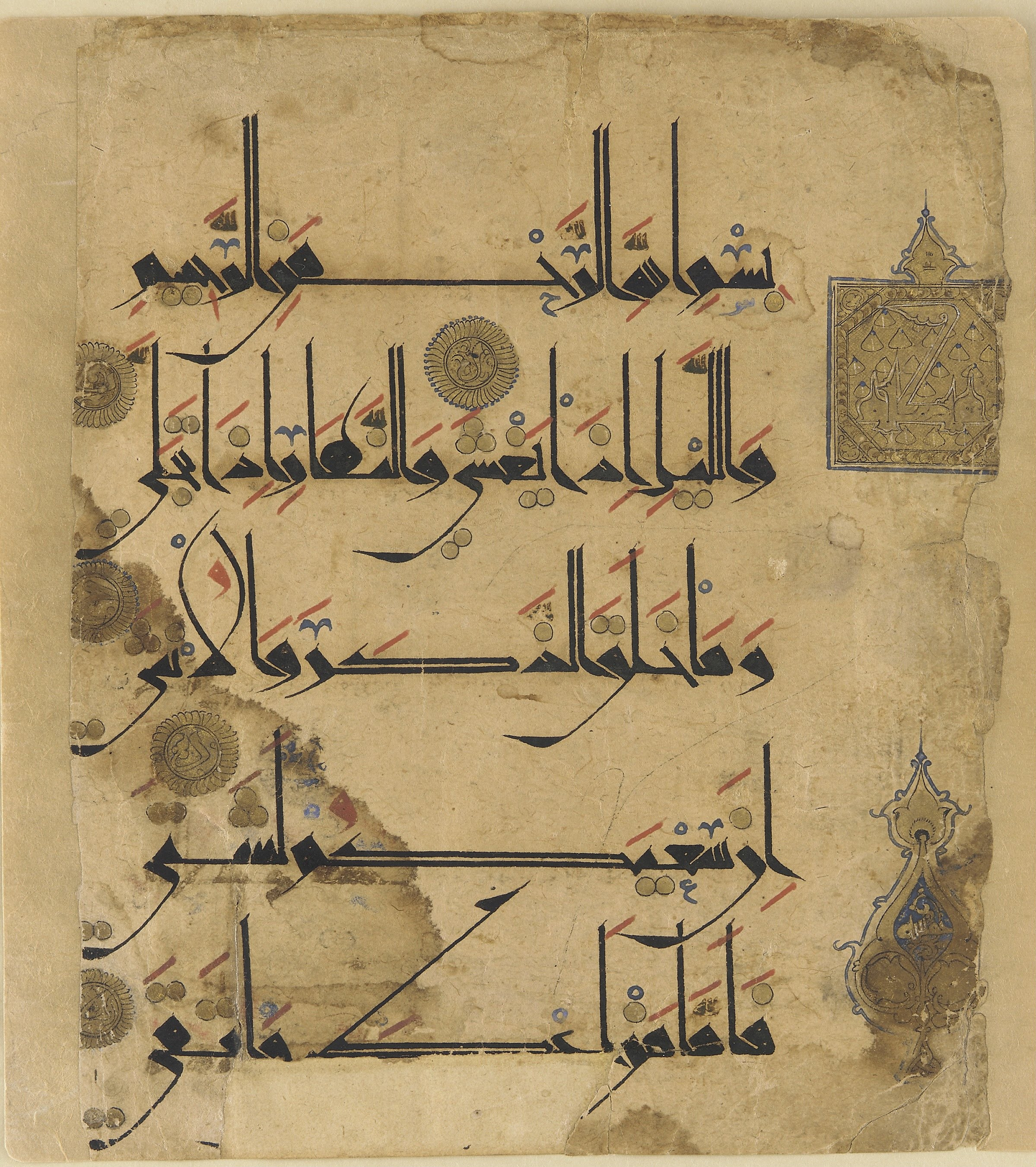
A page from a Persian Qur'an in the 11th century.

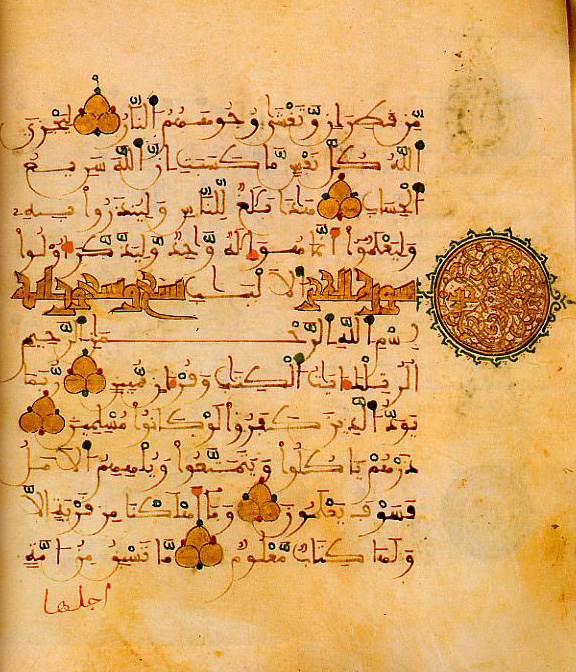
Graphic art in an Egyptian Quran of the 9th or 10th century.

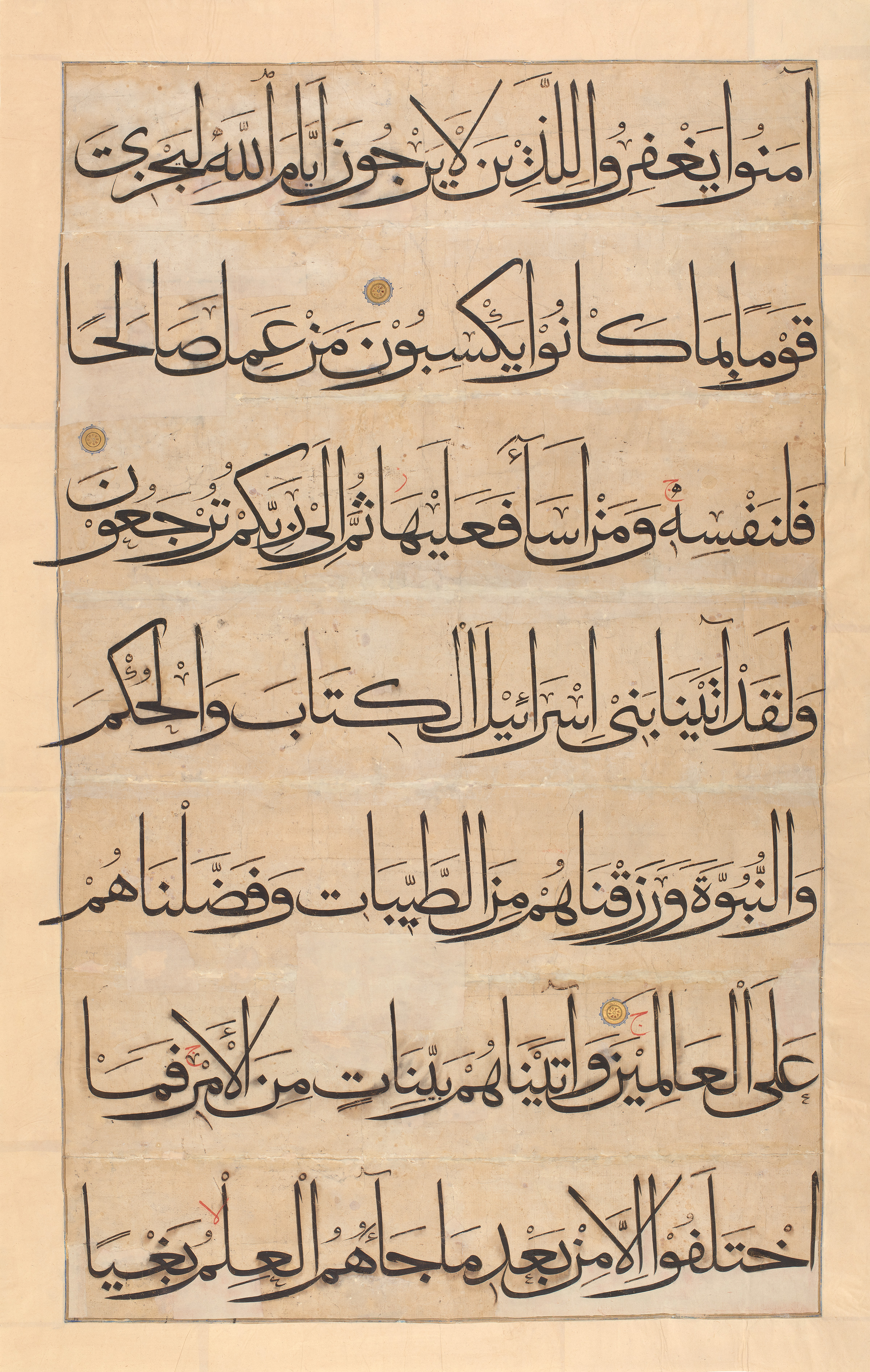
An Iranian Quran of the 15th century found in Uzbekistan.

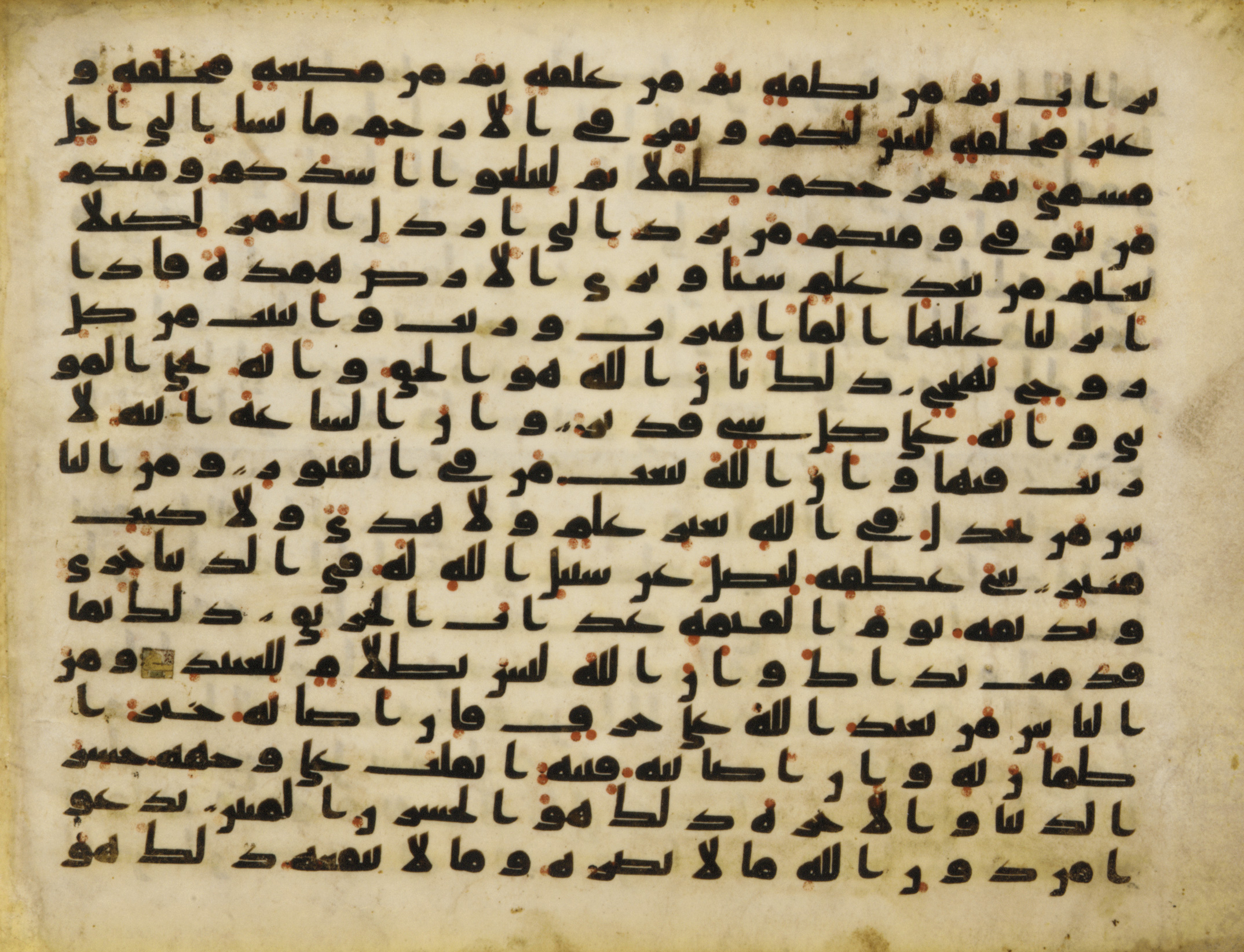
A Quran featuring the Kufic alphabet of the 12th century.

=== Calligraphy ===
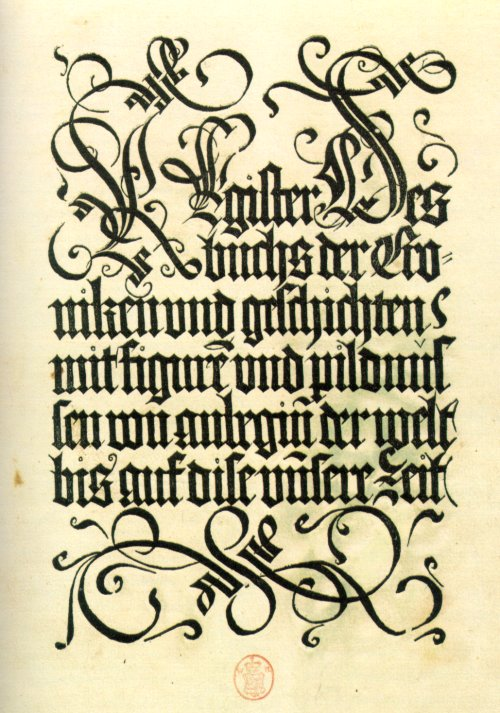
It has been suggested that calligraphy adds a mystical dimension to a text. Such mysticism appears to be consistent with the feeling that a religious text tries to convey. Many religious texts therefore have appeared in calligraphic editions, in order to evoke a spiritual feeling in the reader.

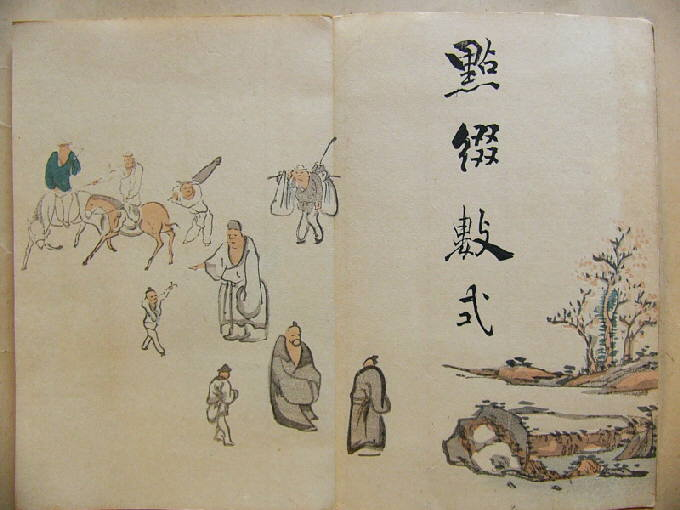
Calligraphy entered Japan from China in the 3rd century BCE, during its states wars. The Japanese used calligraphy to write their haiku on decorative banners.

=== Playing cards ===
It is believed that playing cards were invented in China. (Note: The Kuei t'ien lu, a book of anecdotes written in the 11th century by the historian Ouyang Xiu, has been cited as placing the invention of playing cards in the middle of the Tang dynasty (618–906). However, these early references appear to refer to domino cards.) Chinese playing cards, as we understand the term today, date from at least 1294, when Yen Sengzhu and Zheng Pig-Dog were apparently caught gambling in Enzhou (in modern Shandong Province). Cards entered Europe from the Islamic empire. The earliest authentic references to playing cards in Europe date from 1377. Europe changed the Islamic symbols, such as scimitars and cups, into graphical representations of kings, queens, knights and jesters. Different European countries adopted different suit systems. For instance, some Italian, Spanish and German decks of cards even today do not have queens.

During the 15th century, German printers introduced a woodblock printing technique to produce playing cards. Lower production costs enabled the printed playing cards' quick exportation throughout Europe. The substitution of woodblock printing and hand coloring with copper-plate engraving during the 16th century was the next significant innovation in the manufacture of playing cards. The mass printing of playing cards was revolutionized by the introduction of color lithography in the early 19th century.

Card designs from the Mamluk Sultanate of Egypt. c. 1500. According to a passage in Ibn Taghri Birdi's History of Egypt, 1382-1469 A.D., the future sultan al-Malik al-Mu'ayyad won a large sum of money in a game of cards. In the Islamic empire playing cards the suits were coins, cups, swords, and polo sticks.

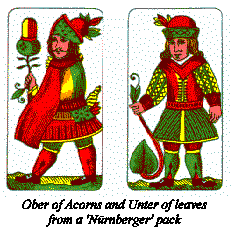
Germans introduced woodblock printing into playing cards designs

=== Heraldry ===
Heraldry is the practice of designing and displaying coats of arms and heraldic badges, and is common among many nations. For example, the Romans used an eagle in their coat of arms, the French used the fleur-de-lis, and the Persians used the sign of their god, Ahura Mazda. Historically, heraldry has been variously described as "the shorthand of history" and "the floral border in the garden of history." It comes from the Germanic compound *harja-waldaz, "army commander". The origins of heraldry lie in the need to distinguish participants in combat when their faces were hidden by iron and steel helmets. Eventually a formal system of rules developed into ever more complex forms of heraldry.

Imperial coat of arms of Charles V, Holy Roman Emperor. From the time of Otto the Great onward, the various German princes elected one of their peers as King of the Germans, after which he would be crowned emperor by the Pope. The last emperor to be crowned by the pope was Charles V; all emperors after him were technically emperors-elect but were universally referred to as Emperor.

Coat of arms of Albert of Sweden. He was the king of Sweden from 1364, and in 1384 he inherited the ducal title of Mecklenburg and united the two countries in a personal union.

Like Western heraldry, Japanese mons were initially held only by aristocratic families, and were gradually adapted by commoners. Japanese traditional formal attire generally displays the mon of the wearer. Commoners without mon often used that of their patron or the organization they belonged to. This the coat of arms of Gion Mamori of Japan.

The White Rose of York, a white heraldic rose, the symbol of the House of York. Traditionally the origins of the emblem are said to go back to Edmund of Langley in the 14th century, the first Duke of York and the founder of the House of York as a Cadet branch of the then-ruling House of Plantagenet. The actual symbolism behind the rose has religious connotations as it represents the Virgin Mary, who was often called the Mystical Rose of Heaven.

== Rise of Print and Reproducible Design ==
=== Emergence of the print and design industry ===
Around 1450, Johann Gutenberg's printing press made books widely available in Europe. The book design of Aldus Manutius developed the book structure that would become the foundation of Western publication design. With the development of the lithographic process, invented by a Czech named Alois Senefelder in 1798 in Austria, the creation of posters became feasible. Although handmade posters existed before, they were mainly used for government announcements. William Caxton, who in 1477 started a printing company in England, produced the first printed poster. In 1870, the advertising poster emerged. (Note: In the 19th and 20th centuries, artists like Jules Chéret, Daumier, Manet, Picasso, Ben Shahn, Norman Rockwell, Alexandre Steinlen, Alphonse Mucha, and Henri de Toulouse-Lautrec made compelling posters advertising products entertainments and restaurants. Matt Morgan's circus advertisements (c. 1890) started the American poster, and this was followed by Edward Penfield, Will H. Bradley, Maxfield Parrish, Howard Chandler Christie, James Montgomery Flagg, Charles Dana Gibson, and Harrison Fisher.)

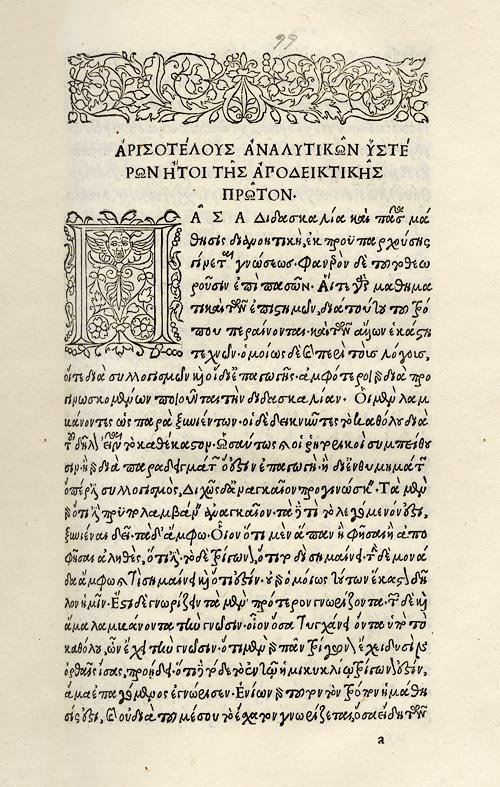
Aristotle printed by Aldus Manutius, 1495-98 (Libreria Antiquaria Pregliasco, Turin)

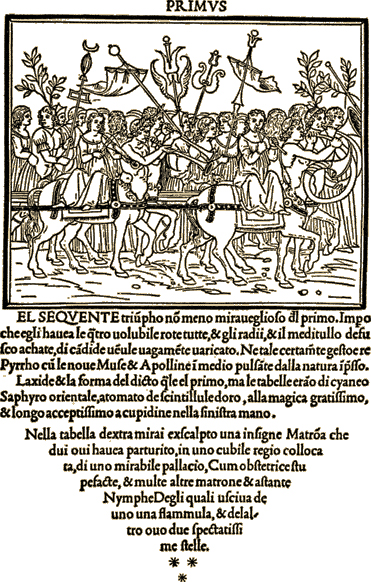
A page from Francesco Colonna's Hypnerotomachia Poliphili, printed by Aldus Manutius

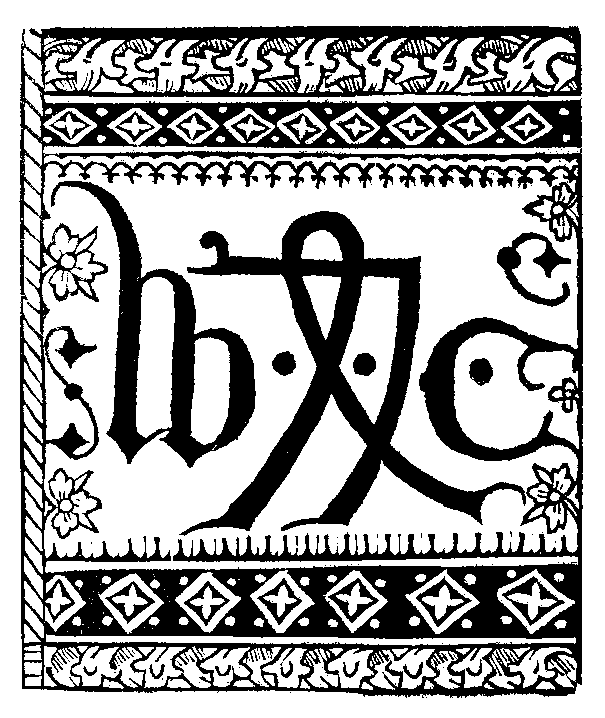
The printer's device of William Caxton, 1478

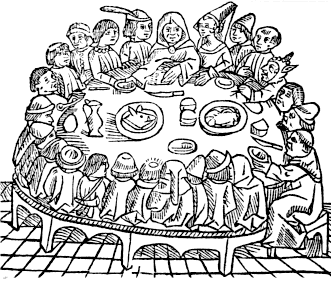
A woodcut from William Caxton's second edition of Chaucer's The Canterbury Tales, printed in 1483

==== Engraving ====
Engraving is the practice of incising a design onto a hard, usually flat, surface, by cutting grooves into it. The process was developed in Germany in the 1430s from the engraving used by goldsmiths to decorate metalwork. Engravers use a hardened steel tool called a burin to cut the design into the surface, most traditionally a copper plate. Gravers come in a variety of shapes and sizes that yield different line types.

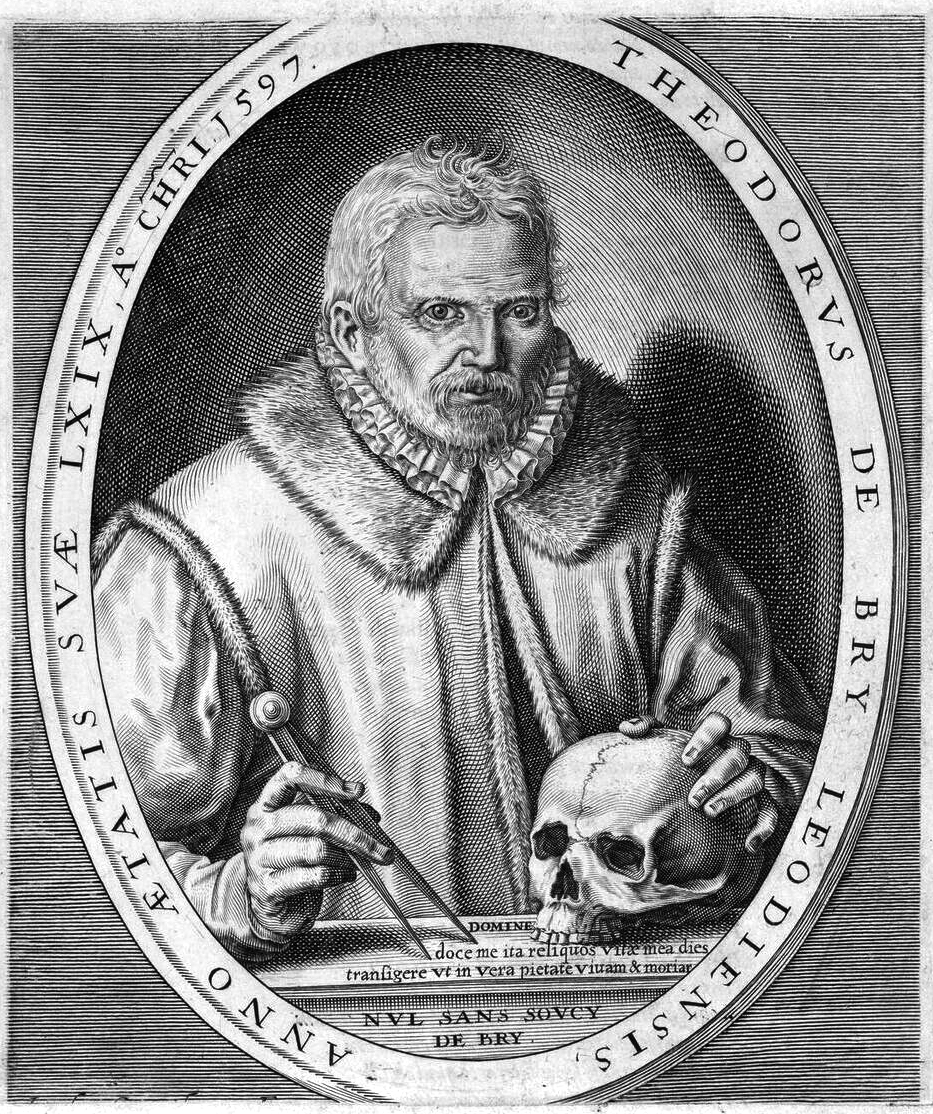
Theodor de Bry (1528–1598) was an engraver, goldsmith and editor. A self-portrait engraving by Theodorus de Bry, confirming his origins from Liège (in Latin, "Leodiensis"), a city at that time belonging neither to Flanders or Wallonia, or even to Belgium.

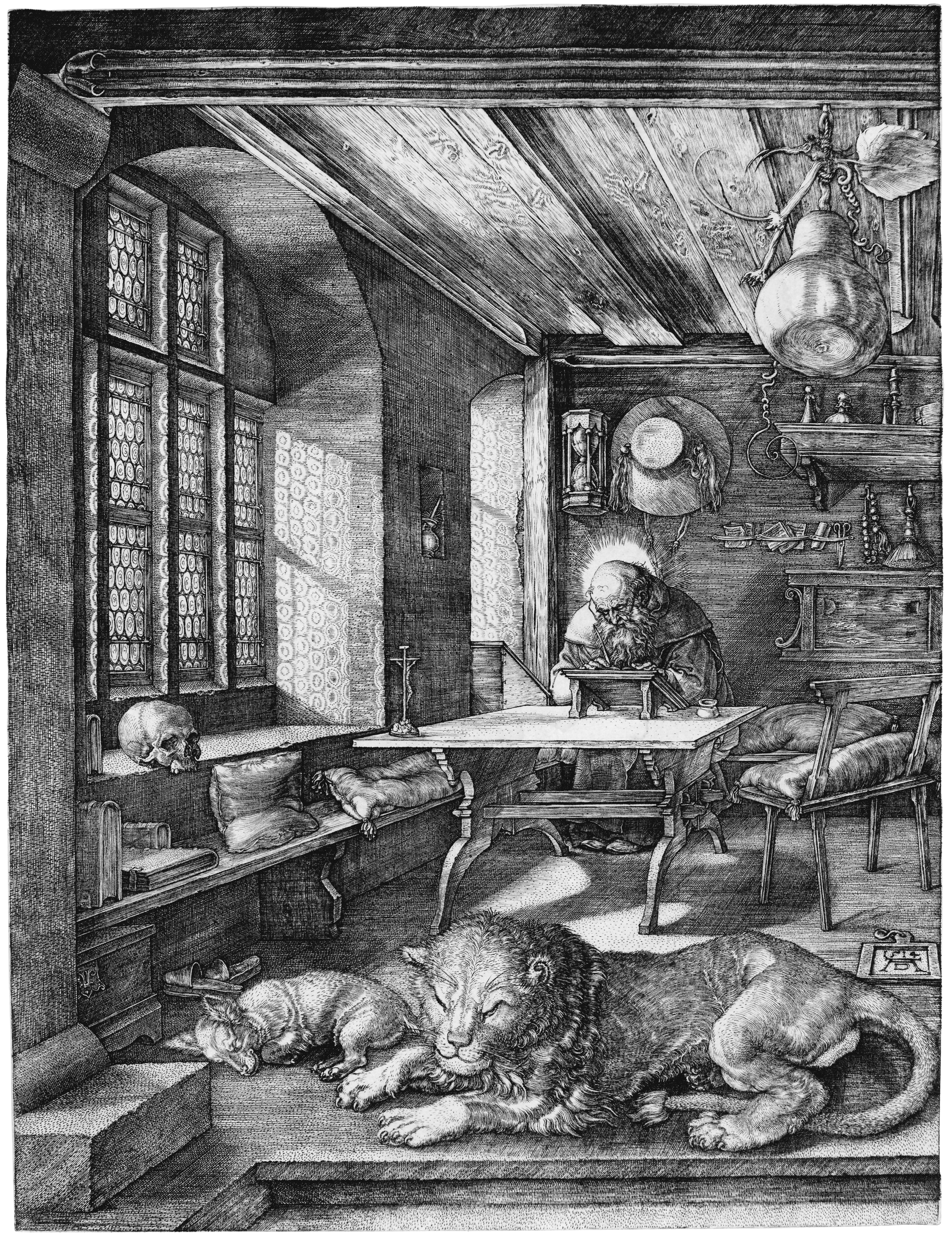
Albrecht Dürer, St. Jerome in His Study (1514). Dürer was a German painter and printmaker.

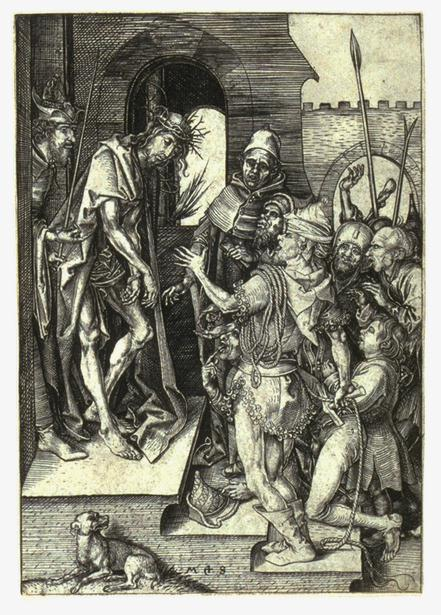
Ecce Homo, engraving, 15th century, by Martin Schongauer(c. 1448 – 1491). He was a German engraver and painter, and was the most important German printmaker before Dürer.

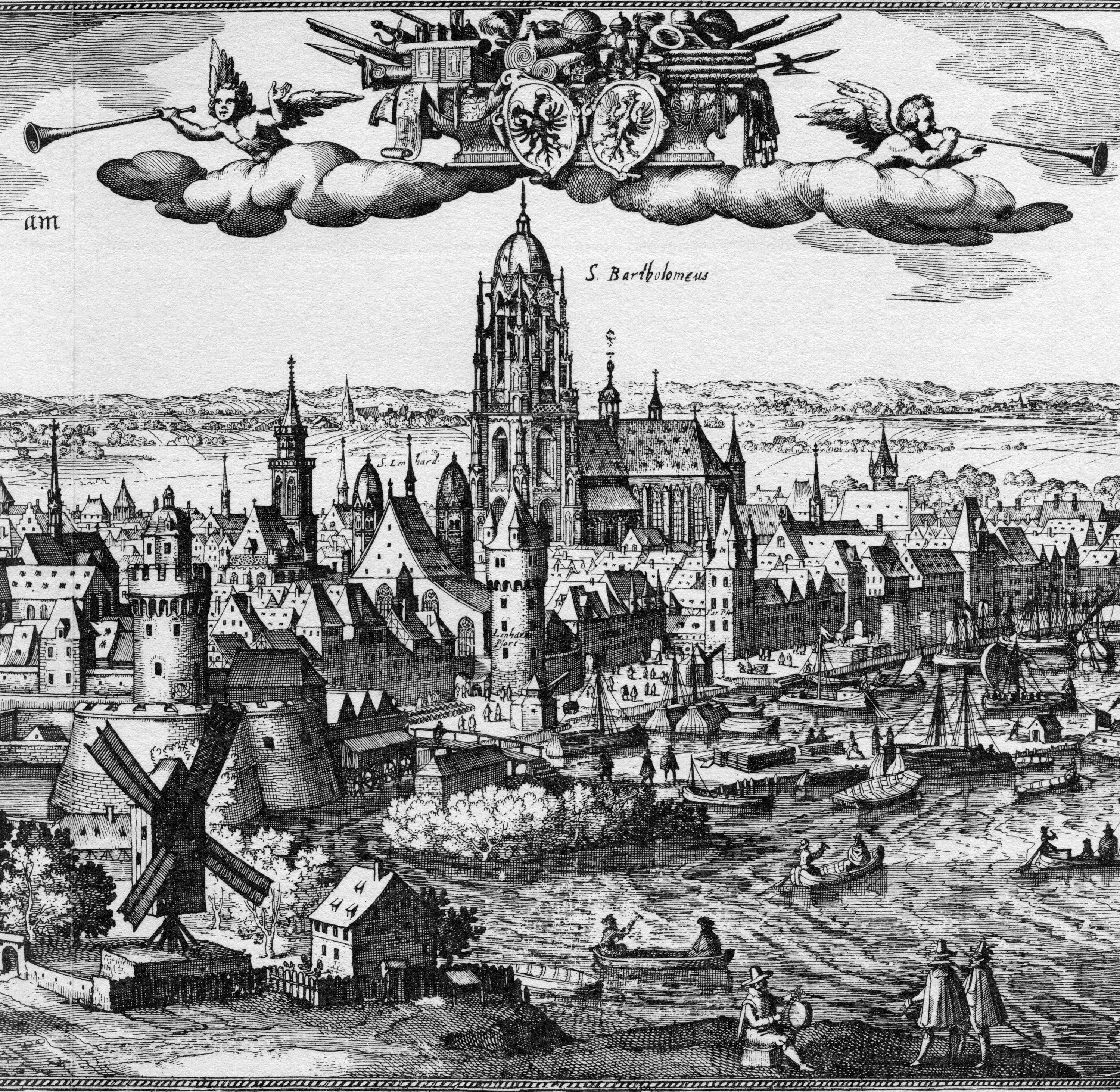
Matthäus Merian, View of Frankfurt, between 1612 and 1619. Merian was a notable Swiss engraver.

==== Etching ====
Etching is the process of using strong acid or mordant to cut into the unprotected parts of a metal surface to create a design in intaglio in the metal. This technique is believed to have been invented by Daniel Hopfer (c. 1470–1536) of Augsburg, Germany, who decorated armour in this way, and applied the method to printmaking. Etching soon came to challenge engraving as the most popular printmaking medium. Its great advantage was that, unlike engraving which requires special skill in metalworking, etching is relatively easy to learn for an artist trained in drawing.

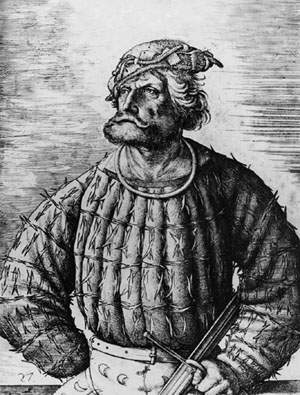
Court jester of Emperor Maximilian I. Etching by Daniel Hopfer, (1493)

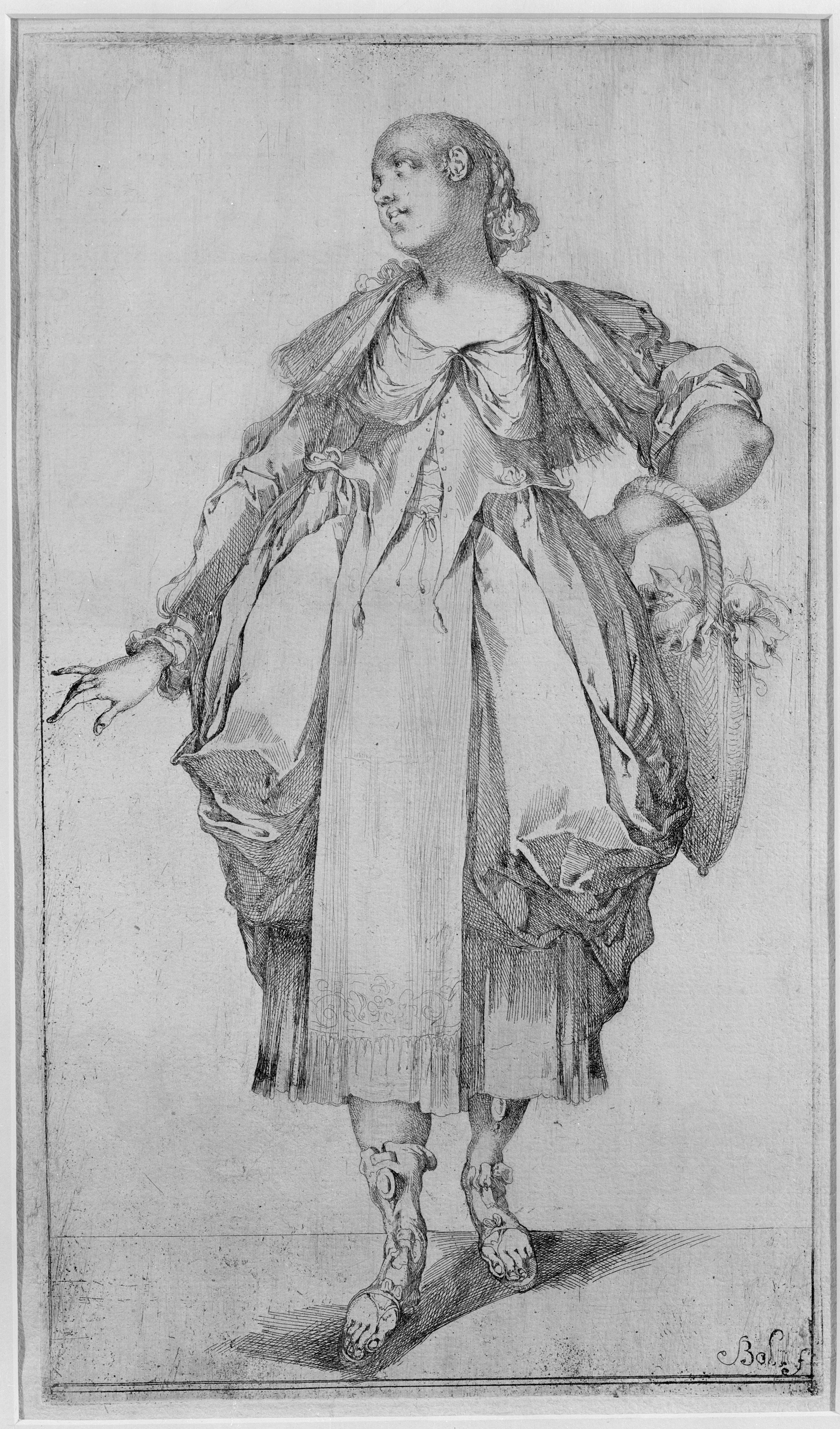
Gardener with Basket, c. 1612, Etching by Jacques Bellange. He was an artist and printmaker from Lorraine, now in France (c. 1575 - 1616)

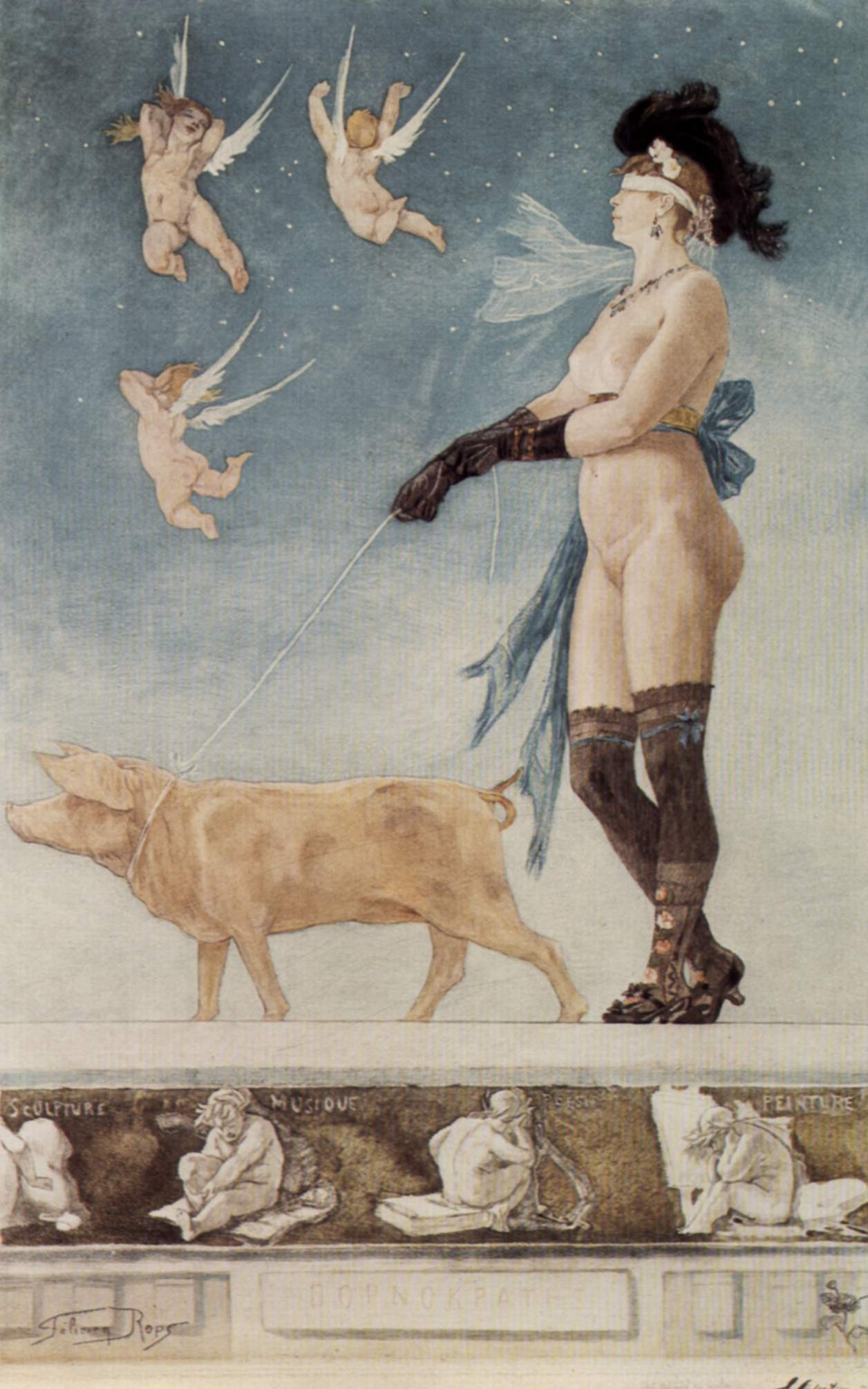
Pornocrates (in etching and aquatint, 1896) by Félicien Rops, a Belgian artist and printmaker

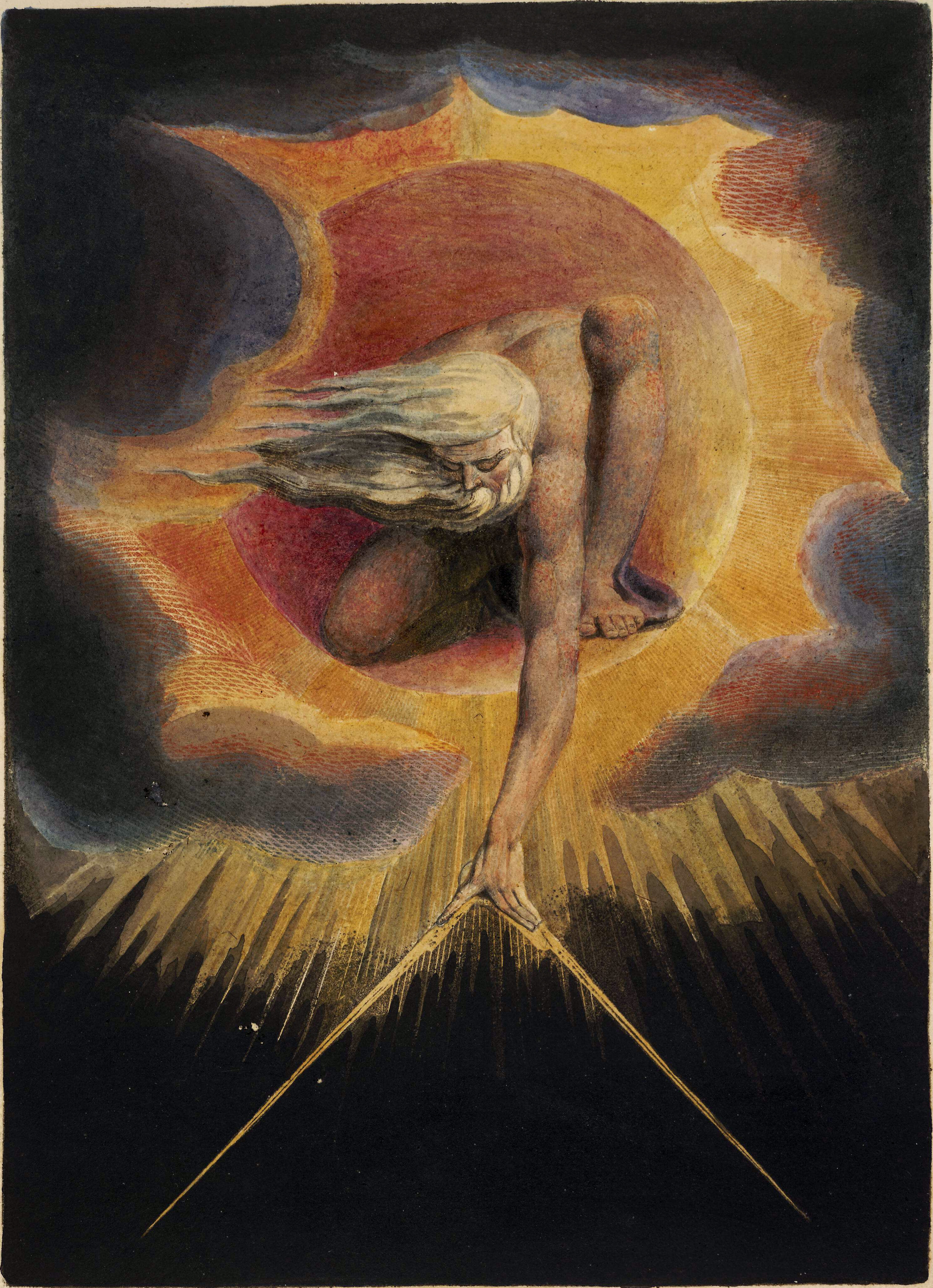
William Blake's Ancient of Days, etching/watercolour, (1794)

=== Placards and posters ===
Placard and posters existed from the ancient times. Persian reliefs depicted important historical events; the Greek axons and the Roman albums, with their decorative designs and announcements, were quite similar to today's posters. In ancient Greece the name of athletes, and games schedules were written on columns that slowly turned on an axis. Romans markets had whitewashed walls on which sellers, money lenders, and slave traders wrote announcements and advertised their products; to attract the attention of customers they added attractive designs to their announcements.

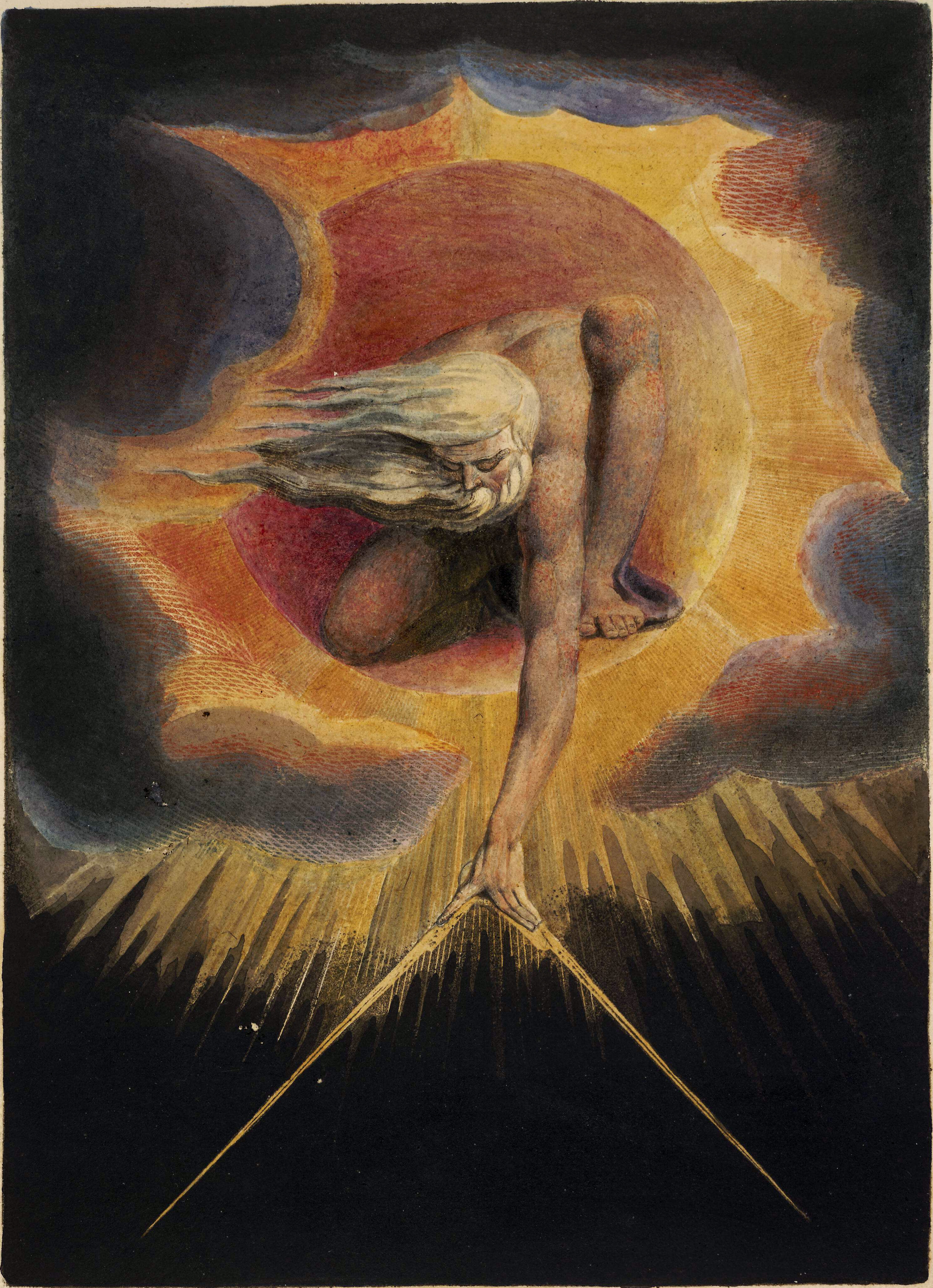

== Information Design and Visual Systems ==
=== Information signs: ISOTYPE ===
Otto Neurath, an Austrian social scientist, used graphic design to facilitate the understanding of various social and economic trends through the creative use of statistical charts. In 1924, Neurath advocated the establishment of the Museum of Economy and Society, an institution for public education and social information. In May 1925, the Museum's first graphical display was opened to the public. The attempt of the exhibition was to make complicated social and economic trends easy to grasp through the use of intuitive and interesting charts. This style of presentation at the time was called the "Viennese method," but now it is known as ISOTYPE charts (International System of TYpographic Picture Education).

Neurath was an enthusiast of sociology. After obtaining his PhD he worked on planning the war economy of the Austro-Hungarian empire. However, by 1919 he was engaged in the planning for a wholly new economic system of the chaotic and short-lived Bavarian Soviet Republic. He proposed the abolition of money, but before this could be implemented, the republic was bloodily overthrown by Weimar's Social Democrats. Neurath escaped to Vienna, where he became an activist for the self-help squatters' movement. In the 1920s he joined the Vienna Circle of Logical Positivists, who attempted to establish a scientific foundation for philosophy; and at the same time he pioneered the graphic methods that became Isotype and were shown in the Museum of Society and Economy.

As Ellen Lupton argues, Neurath suggested:

...two central rules for generating the vocabulary of international pictures: reduction, for determining the style of individual signs; and consistency, for giving a group of signs the appearance of a coherent system". Reduction means finding the simplest expression of an object. For instance, silhouette is a basic technique for reduction. It emulates the shadow of the image without any human intervention. Thus, it is a natural cast rather than a cultural interpretation. The sign as geometric representation of reality is both a rhetorical connotation and a practical technique for many symbol designers. Martin Krampen suggested "simplified realism;" he urged designers to "start from silhouette photographs of objects... and then by subtraction... obtain silhouette pictographs."

Gerd Arntz was a socio-political activist in Düsseldorf, where he joined a movement that aimed to turn Germany into a radical-socialist state form. As a revolutionary artist, Arntz was connected to the Cologne-based "progressive artists group" (Gruppe progressiver Künstler Köln) and depicted the life of workers and the class struggle in abstracted figures on woodcuts. Published in leftist magazines, his work was noticed by Otto Neurath who for his "Vienna method of visual statistics" needed a designer of pictograms that could summarize a subject at a glance. Neurath invited the young artists to come to Vienna in 1928, and work on further developing his ISOTYPE. Arntz designed around 4,000 different pictograms and abstracted illustrations for this system.

Neurath's motto was "words divide, images unite". Many of his designs, together with those of his protégé Gerd Arntz, were the forebears of pictograms we now encounter everywhere, such as the man and woman on toilet doors. As Marina Vishmidt suggests: "Neurath's pictograms owe much to the Modernist belief that reality may be modified by being codified – standardised, easy-to-grasp templates as a revolution in human affairs.

==== Olympic pictograms ====
The logos and pictograms for the Olympic Games change every four years and the sponsoring city develops its own communication design program. Pictograms first appeared at the Olympics in London in 1948. They came into wide use since they simultaneously communicate a message to a large number of people who speak different languages. In the absence of such signs in venues like the Olympic village, there would be a need for many written signs in different languages (for example, for rowing: Roning، Κωπηλασία، Aviron, قایق رانی، and ボート競技, which not only would be costly but also may confuse the viewers).

Notable examples of Olympic pictogram projects include pictograms from the Mexico City 1968 Summer Olympics by Lance Wyman and Otl Aicher's designs for the 1972 Summer Olympics in Munich. In the words of Michael Bierut, Aicher "developed a set of pictograms of such breathtaking elegance and clarity that they would never be topped. Aicher (1922–1991), founder of the Ulm design school and consultant to Braun and Lufthansa, was the quintessential German designer: precise, cool and logical".

=== Astronomical, statistical, and scientific charts ===
Astronomical charts have a long history. For instance, an engraving of an ancient Egyptian diagram of the heavens from the Temple of Dendara, depicts the sky on the date of the founding of the temple in 54 BC. The above chart is an astronomical map of the sky drawn by Nicholas Copernicus in 1543 that replaced an earlier chart by Cellarius showing an Earth-centred universe.

In this graphic chart the position of two planets in relation to a viewer, and their position as they appear to a specific viewer is shown. These types of charts are used in various textbooks to describe various scientific phenomena. They are also used by manufacturers in operation manuals to help the buyers become familiar with the workings of a gadget.

Bubble chart, which can show the relationship between three variables. These charts facilitate the understanding of social, economic, medical, and other scientific relationships.

A warming stripes graphic showing global average surface temperature changes, one stripe per year. An example of this work, which was compared to a Morris Louis painting, was included in Pirouette: Turning Points in Design, a 2025 exhibition at the Museum of Modern Art.

Statistics are becoming increasingly more important in modern society. Various types of computer software can easily transform large sets of data into charts, graphs, and statistics of various types, to provide us with succinct information to make decisions.

== Advertising ==
Graphic design is used in advertising to announce a persuasive message by an identified sponsor, or the promotion by a firm of its products to existing and potential customers. Egyptians used papyrus to make sales messages and wall posters. Commercial messages and political campaign displays have been found in the ruins of Pompeii and Ancient Arabia. Lost-and-found advertising on papyrus was common in Ancient Greece and Ancient Rome. Wall or rock painting for commercial advertising is another manifestation of an ancient advertising form, which is present to this day in many parts of Asia, Africa, and South America.

=== Advertising in the 19th century ===
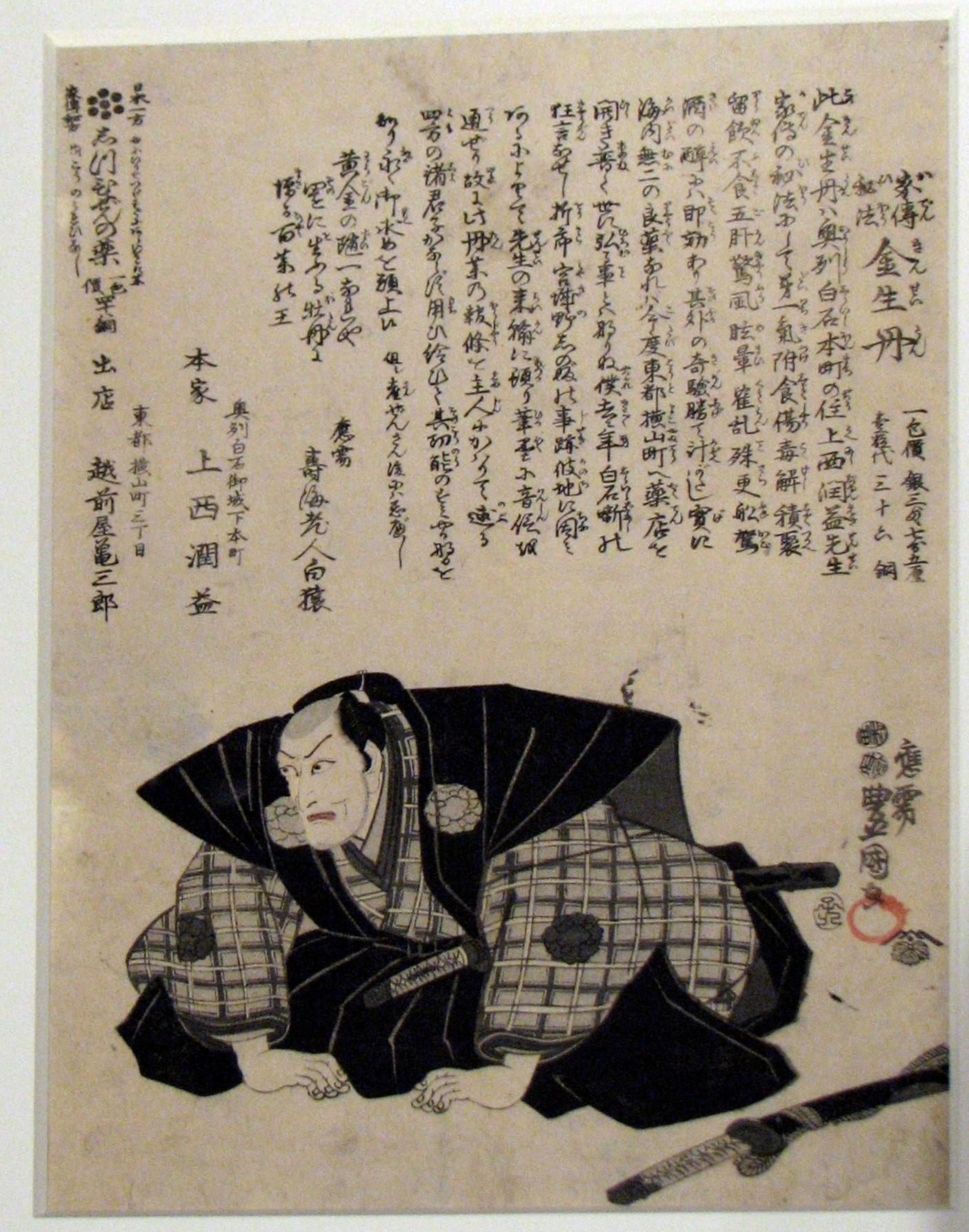
Advertising flyer from 1806 for a traditional medicine called Kinseitan, displayed at the Edo-Tokyo Museum

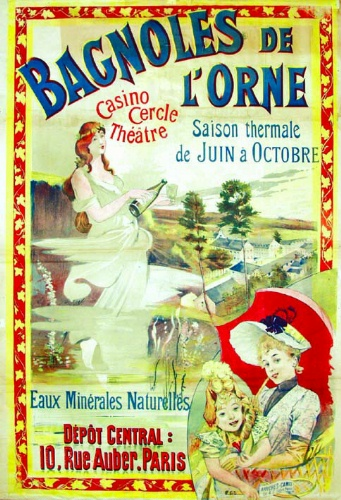
19th-century advertising poster for the hydrotherapic baths of Bagnoles-de-l'Orne (France)

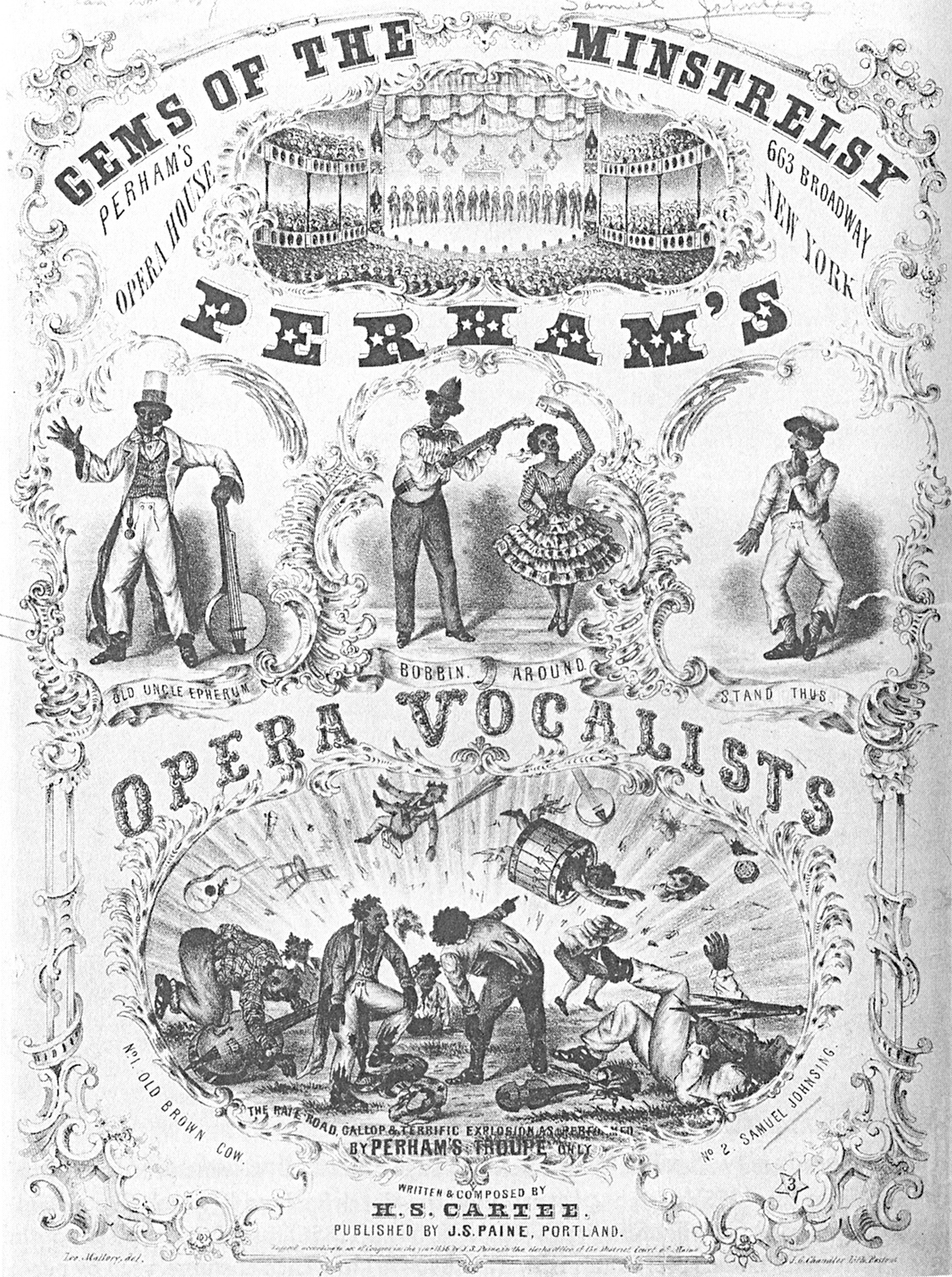
Playbill for Perham's Opera Vocalists, 1856

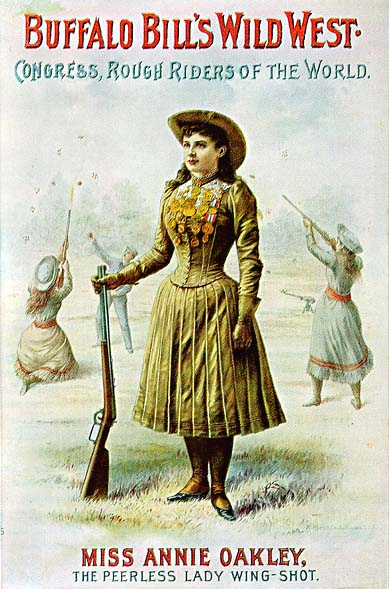
Poster from the second half of the 1880s advertising Buffalo Bill's Wild West show, advertising "Miss Annie Oakley, the peerless lady wing-shot"

=== Advertising in the early 20th century ===
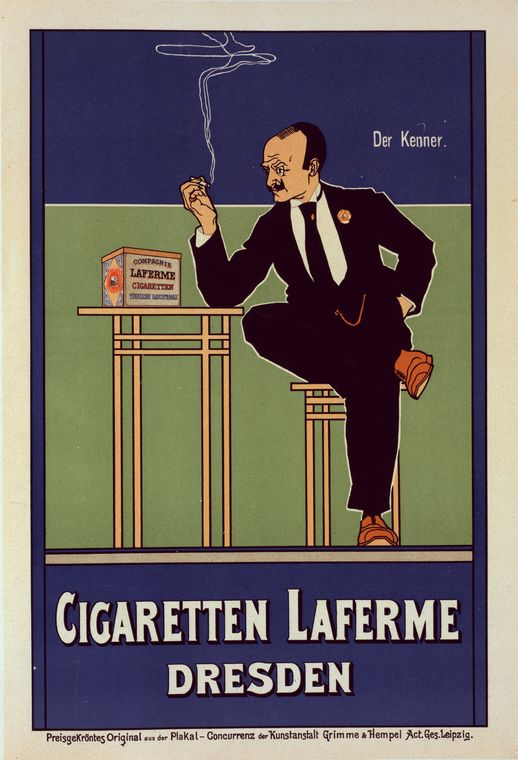
German poster by Fritz Rehm for Laferme Cigarettes (published 1896–1900)

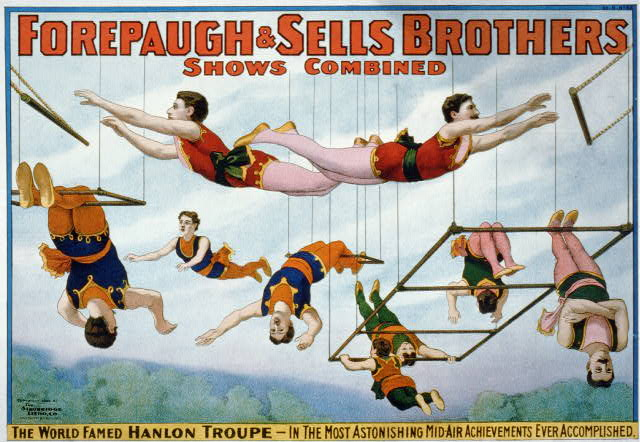
Circus poster, 1899. "Forepaugh & Sells Brothers Shows Combined. The world-famed Hanlon Troupe in the most astonishing mid-air achievements ever accomplished."

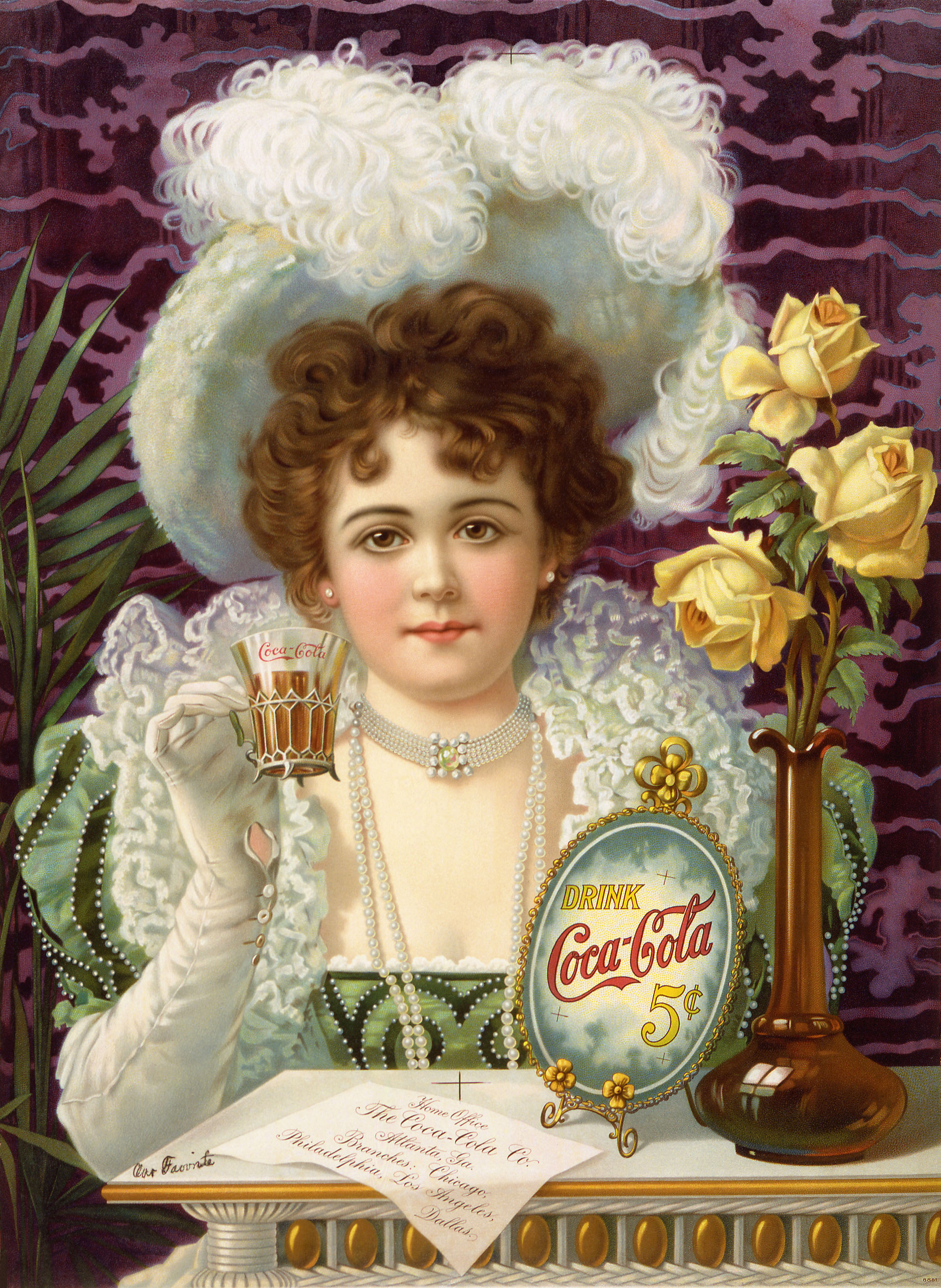
"Drink Coca-Cola 5¢", an 1890s advertising poster showing a woman in fancy clothes (partially vaguely influenced by 16th- and 17th-century styles) drinking Coke.

==== German Plakatstil, "Poster style" ====
In the early 20th century, Germany became the cradle of many of the avant-garde art movements, particularly posters. This created the "Plakatstil" or "Poster style" movement. This movement became very influential and had a considerable impact on the graphic design of posters. Posters in this style featured few but strong colours, a sharp, non-cluttered, minimal composition and bold, clear types.

===== Ludwig Hohlwein =====
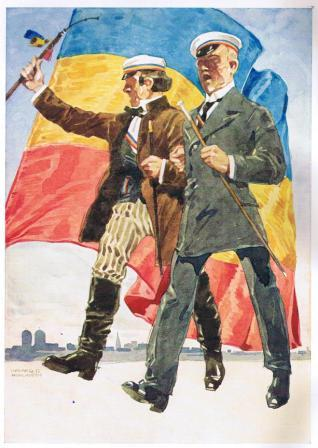
Poster for the 50th Federal Festival of the German Corps, Munich 1913.

Ludwig Hohlwein was born in Germany in 1874. He was trained and practiced as an architect until 1906 when he switched to poster design. Hohlwein's adaptations of photographic images was based on a deep and intuitive understanding of graphical principles. His creative use of color and architectural compositions dispels any suggestion that he used photos as a substitute for creative design.

Riquet Pralinen Tea c. 1920–1926. Hohlwein was born in the Rhine-Main region of Germany, though he and his work are associated with Munich and Bavaria in southern Germany. There were two schools of Gebrauchsgrafik in Germany at the time, North and South. Hohlwein's high tonal contrasts and a network of interlocking shapes made his work instantly recognizable.

Poster historian Alain Weill comments that,

Hohlwein was the most prolific and brilliant German posterist of the 20th century.... Beginning with his first efforts, Hohlwein found his style with disconcerting facility. It would vary little for the next forty years. The drawing was perfect from the start, nothing seemed alien to him, and in any case, nothing posed a problem for him. His figures are full of touches of color and a play of light and shade that brings them out of their background and gives them substance.

=== Advertising in the 1920s-30s era ===
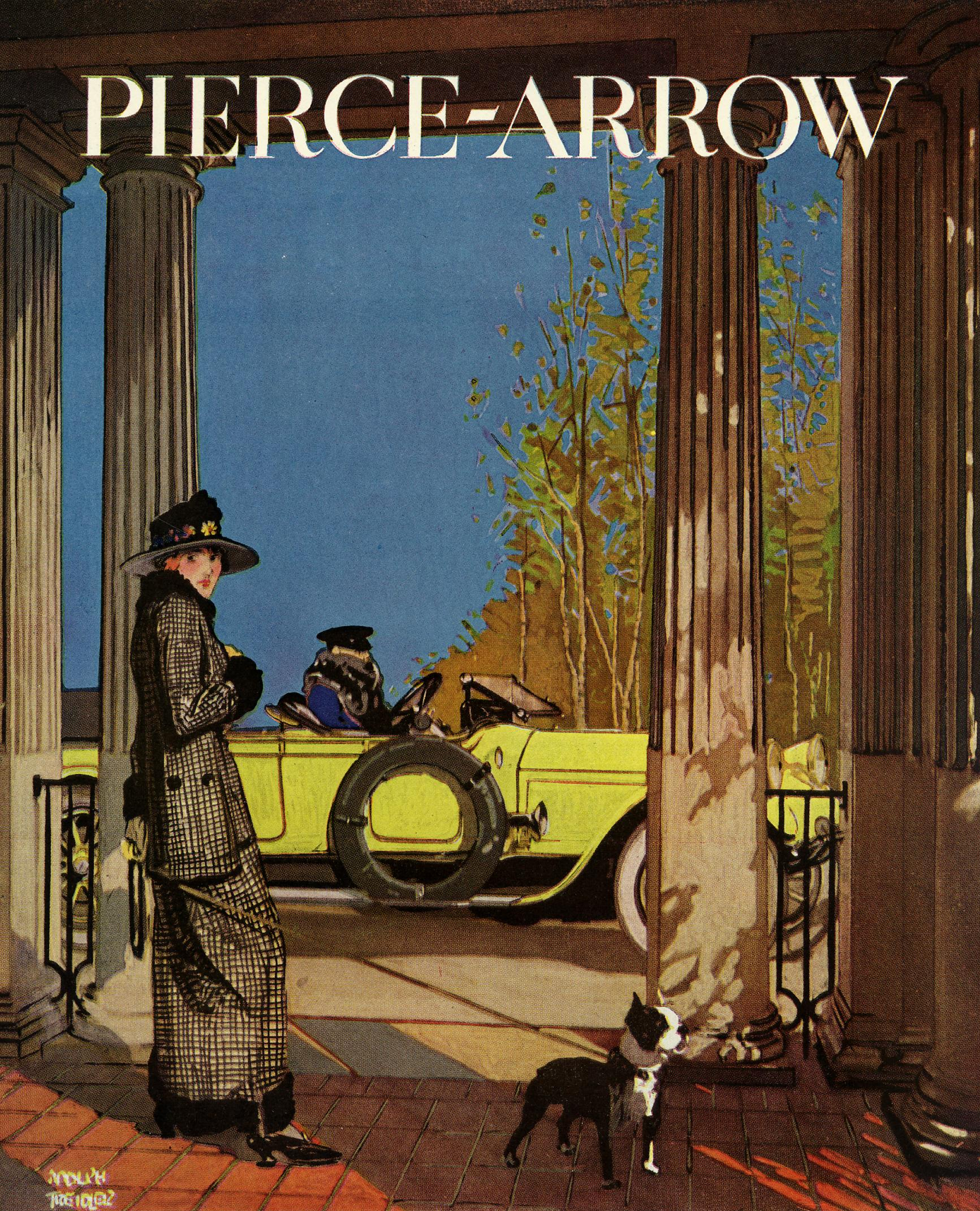
Pierce-Arrow auto ad, from advertisement in Life magazine, 1919

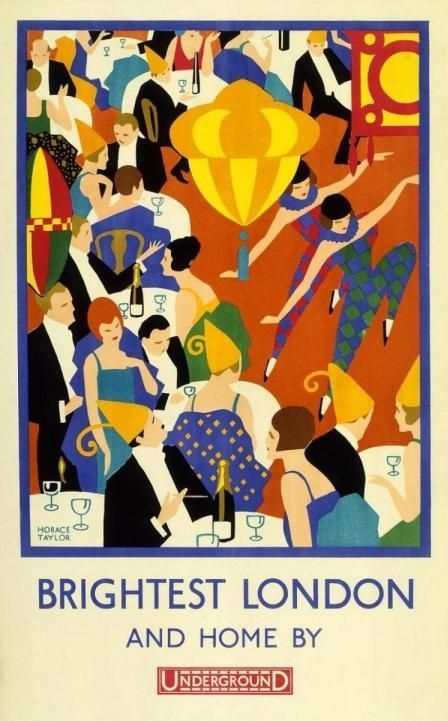
The London Underground Electric Railway Company Ltd. published this poster in 1924.

== Post-World War II Poster Design ==
After the Second World War, with the emergence of new color printing technology and particularly the appearance of computers, the art of posters underwent a new revolutionary phase. People could now create color posters on their laptop computers and create color prints at a very low cost. Unfortunately, the high cost of sophisticated printing processes can only be afforded mostly by government entities and large corporations. With the emergence of the Internet, the role of posters in conveying information has greatly diminished. However, some artist still use chromolithography in order to create works of arts in the form of prints. In this regard, the difference between painting and print has been narrowed considerably.

=== Psychedelic design ===
The word "psychedelic" means "mind manifesting". Psychedelic art is art inspired by the psychedelic experience induced by drugs, and refers above all to the art movement of the counterculture of the 1960s. Psychedelic visual arts were a counterpart to psychedelic rock music. Concert posters, album covers, light shows, murals, comic books, underground newspapers, and more reflected revolutionary political, social, and spiritual sentiments inspired by psychedelic states of consciousness.

Although San Francisco remained the hub of psychedelic art into the early 1970s, the style also developed internationally. The English rock band Pink Floyd worked extensively with London-based designers Hipgnosis to create graphics to support the concepts in their albums like the cover of the soundtrack of the film More'. Life magazine's cover and lead article for the September 1, 1967, issue at the height of the Summer of Love focused on the explosion of psychedelic art on posters and the artists as leaders in the hippie counterculture community.

The 1968 animated film Yellow Submarine was a milestone in graphic design. Inspired by new trends in art, it sits alongside the dazzling Pop art styles of Andy Warhol, Martin Sharp, Alan Aldridge, and Peter Blake. Heinz Edelmann was hired by TVC as the art director for Yellow Submarine. Before making the film, TVC had produced The Beatles, a 39-episode TV series "produced" by Al Brodax and King Features. Despite the critical acclaim for his design work for the film, Edelman never worked on another animated feature.

Peter Max's artwork was a part of the psychedelic movement in graphic design. His work was much imitated in commercial illustration in the late 1960s and early 1970s. In 1970, many of Max's products and posters were featured in the exhibition "The World of Peter Max" which opened at the M.H. de Young Memorial Museum in San Francisco. Max appeared on the cover of Life magazine with an eight-page feature article, as well as The Tonight Show Starring Johnny Carson and The Ed Sullivan Show.

=== Poster design in Japan ===
The distinctive aesthetics of Japanese graphic design have been admired over many decades, winning awards at prestigious international venues.

The works of Japanese graphic designers are noted for their resourcefulness, visual expression, and technical quality of print.

=== Chinese cultural revolution ===
The poster "Revolution promotes production", created by He Shuxui, celebrates traditional ceramic painting techniques. A plaque in the background commemorates a group of ceramic workers as an outstanding productive unit, 1974.

A worker named Wang Qingcang created the poster, "The three countries of Indo Zhina (Lao, Cambodia, Vietnam) will win!". On the upper left side, it says "Enemies are getting sicker and sicker every day, and we are getting better and better every day." (The U.S. supported Indo Zhina (Indochina) governments while China supported their communist guerilla forces.) October 1964.

The poster "Mao Zedong at Jinggang Mountain" depicts a young Mao Zedong sitting against the background of the Jinggang Mountains. The mountain symbolizes Mao's leadership and his vision to unite the oppressed masses to fight against the ruling class. Created by Liu Chunhua and Wang Hui, October 1969.

The poster, "Time is Money", features the famous Canadian doctor Norman Bethune (Dr. Bai Qiuen in Chinese), racing to rescue another patient. Bethune became an early proponent of universal health care, the success of which he observed during a visit to the Soviet Union. As a doctor in Montreal, Bethune frequently sought out the poor and gave them free medical care. As a thoracic surgeon, he traveled to Spain (1936–1937) and to China (1938–1939) to perform battlefield surgical operations on war casualties. Created by Zhang Xin Gua. Hebei People's Publishing House.

=== Culture and politics ===
Richard Avedon was an American photographer. Avedon capitalized on his early success in fashion photography and expanded into the realm of fine art. This is a solarised poster portraits of the Beatles, originally produced for 9 January 1967 edition of the American magazine Look.

The "Barack Obama "Hope" poster" poster is an iconic image of Barack Obama designed by artist Shepard Fairey. The image became one of the most widely recognized symbols of Obama's campaign message, spawning many variations and imitations, including some commissioned by the Obama campaign. In January 2009, after Obama had won the election, Fairey's mixed-media stenciled portrait version of the image was acquired by the Smithsonian Institution for its National Portrait Gallery. (In October 2009, Fairey admitted that he had based the poster on an Associated Press photograph and had fabricated and destroyed evidence to hide the fact.)

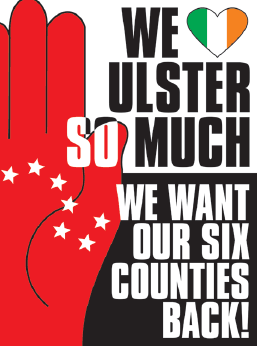
Political poster about Ulster by Tiocfaidh Ár Lá

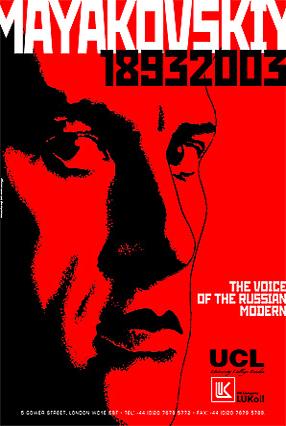
Andrew Pavlovsky's poster MAYAKOVSKIY (2003). This poster is a graphic illustration of a true interest in Constructivism in Russia today. Constructivism was almost always in demand in Russia and it has since become one of Russia's principal trends. Some contemporary Russian artists and art historians have already suggested the new term "Additive Constructivism." It emphasizes the return to modernism, which starts to significantly push out the postmodern art practices. It's not a postmodern performance. The Constructivist color solution proves that so it is.

=== Computer-aided graphic design in posters ===
With the arrival of computer-aided graphic design an assortment of novel effects, digital techniques, and innovative styles have emerged in poster designs. With software such as Adobe Photoshop, Corel Painter, and Microsoft Paint, image editing has become very cheap and artists can easily experiment with a variety of color schemes, filters, and special effects. For instance, utilizing various filters of Photoshop, many artists have created "vectored" designs in posters where a photographic image is solarized, sharpened, rendered into watercolor or stained glass effects, or converted into bare lines with block colors. Other designs created soft or blurry styles, ripple or cascade effects, and other special filters.

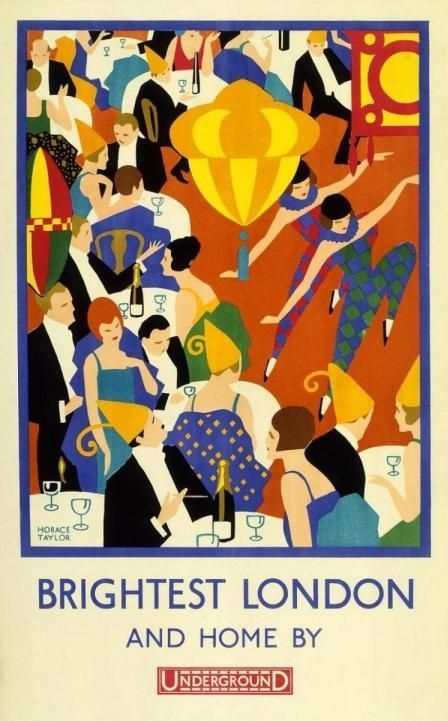

=== 1972 Olympics and Otl Aicher posters ===
The internationally recognized artist Otl Aicher was a graphic designer, urban planner, photographer, and the mastermind behind the imagery for the 1972 Munich Olympics and the Rotis typeface. Growing up as a child in Nazi Germany, Aicher, along with his friends Hans and Sophie Scholl, organized the anti-Nazi political organization Die Weisse Rose (the White Rose). In 1943, the Scholls and Aicher were arrested by the Nazi party. While Aicher was released, the Scholls went to trial, where they were found guilty of treason and executed. After the war Aicher went on to help rebuild his ravaged city of Ulm and to found the influential international school of design, Hochschule für Gestaltung (HfG).

In Munich's original bid for the 1972 Olympics, one of the main promises was to create a synthesis between sport and art. Otl Aicher was appointed as the head of the committee's visual design group, and his mandate was to deploy art in a relatively new role of promoting this global public event. From the start, posters were high on the agenda of the organizing committee, and ideas were discussed as early as September 1967 to publish a series of art posters that would "relate artistic activity to the Olympic Games and engage the best artists to collaborate," and also to commission an internationally known artist for the official poster.

Otl Aicher created the official posters for the 1972 Olympic Games in Munich. As he pointed out in his essay "Entwurf der Moderne" ("Designing the Modern Era"), the German word entwerfen, meaning "to draft" or "design", also contains the verb werfen, meaning "to throw". But where? To whom? What? And with what intention? As Benjamin Secher writes:

He devised an invigorating, almost Day-glo palette for the Olympics that was utterly free of red and black — banned for their association with the German flag. Athletes depicted in the official posters for each sport had their uniforms stripped of any national identifier, leaving the emphasis firmly on individual effort. Even the logo for the Games, a graphic of a radiant sun, hammered home the message of universality and, above all, optimism.

Aicher developed a comprehensive system to articulate the games' character across a wide range of materials, from signage to printed pieces and even staff uniforms. As the introduction to his exhibition at states: "His works, including official posters and sporting event tickets, demonstrate the design tools Aicher used to join individual elements to the collective: structural grids, a bold and animating color palette, and ingenious pictograms. Aicher's orderly and pleasant design nimbly carried the weight of modern German history as it repositioned the nation's hospitality on the world stage".

== Contemporary Design ==
=== Dynamic designs and computer animation ===
Computer animation creates the illusion of motion by viewing a succession of computer-generated still images. In the past, animation was produced by filming painted sequences on plastic or paper cels. The above animation was created from photos by Eadweard Muybridge in 1887. Computer animation can be used to produce special effects for educational purposes, such as the study of planetary motions, particle collisions, or fluid dynamics.

Dynamic graphics are used to facilitate understanding of concepts in science, engineering, medicine, education, and business. Computer graphics facilitate the production of images that range in complexity from simple line drawings to three-dimensional reconstructions of data. The evolution of a phenomenon through time and its interactions with other elements can be shown through animation.

In this 3-D dynamic design a house is studied from various angles. These types of animations can be very useful in the study of various objects. They can also be used to study the evolution of a process through time.

The art of dynamic design is still in its infancy. With the availability of sophisticated computer graphics techniques, the horizon has been expanded enormously for graphic designers.

A climate spiral data visualization graphic—a concept designed by climate scientist Ed Hawkins—depicts global warming under a high-emissions scenario.

=== Pioneers of modern graphic design ===
In 1907, AEG (Allgemeine Elektricitäts-Gesellschaft) retained architect Peter Behrens as artistic consultant. He designed the entire corporate identity (logotype, product design, publicity, etc.) for AEG. He never became an employee of AEG but worked as an artistic consultant.

Paul Rand, an American graphic designer, is best known for his corporate logo designs. His career began with a part-time position creating stock images for a syndicate that supplied graphics to various newspapers and magazines. Rand was able to amass a large portfolio influenced by the German advertising style Sachplakat (object poster) as well as the works of Gustav Jensen.

The NASA Worm logo designed by Bruce Blackburn and Richard Danne proved to be divisive. It was used from 1975–1992, retired, and then reinstated as a secondary logo in 2020. The Worm logo was included in Pirouette: Turning Points in Design, a 2025 exhibition at the Museum of Modern Art featuring "widely recognized design icons [...] highlighting pivotal moments in design history."

Raymond Loewy, one of the best-known industrial designers of the 20th century, was the designer of the Shell logo and the Lucky Strike package. Loewy was first approached by the Greyhound Corporation to redesign its logo. The company's logo looked like a "fat mongrel," he said. So, he created a slimmed-down version that is still used today.

William Golden, a designer whose only formal schooling was at the Vocational School for Boys, in conjunction with the Didot typeface developed the famous CBS eye logo. It has been suggested that the eye was inspired by an article in Alexey Brodovitch's Portfolio about the subject of Shaker design.

=== Logos and trademarks ===
A trademark is a distinctive sign or indicator used by an individual, company, or other entity to identify its products or services and to distinguish them from those of other producers. A trademark is a type of intellectual property, and typically a name, word, phrase, logo, symbol, design, image, or a combination of these elements.

The Coca-Cola logo by Frank Mason Robinson, created in 1885. (Note: There is no proof as to who originally hand-wrote it, but Master Penman Louis Madarasz (1859-1910) was said to have told one of his students that the work was his. When the work was created, Madarasz had a mail-order business and could easily have done it, and the writing style is similar to his. In the book An Elegant Hand, by William E. Henning, it states that Robinson, who was the bookkeeper of the firm, originated the name "Coca-Cola" and specified that it be written in Spencerian script. In a 1914 court case, Robinson testified that he was "practically the originator" and that "some engraver here by the name of Frank Ridge was brought into it.") This old logotype has been around for more than a century, which could be regarded as a measure of its success. A successful logotype will create a sense of loyalty among the clientele.

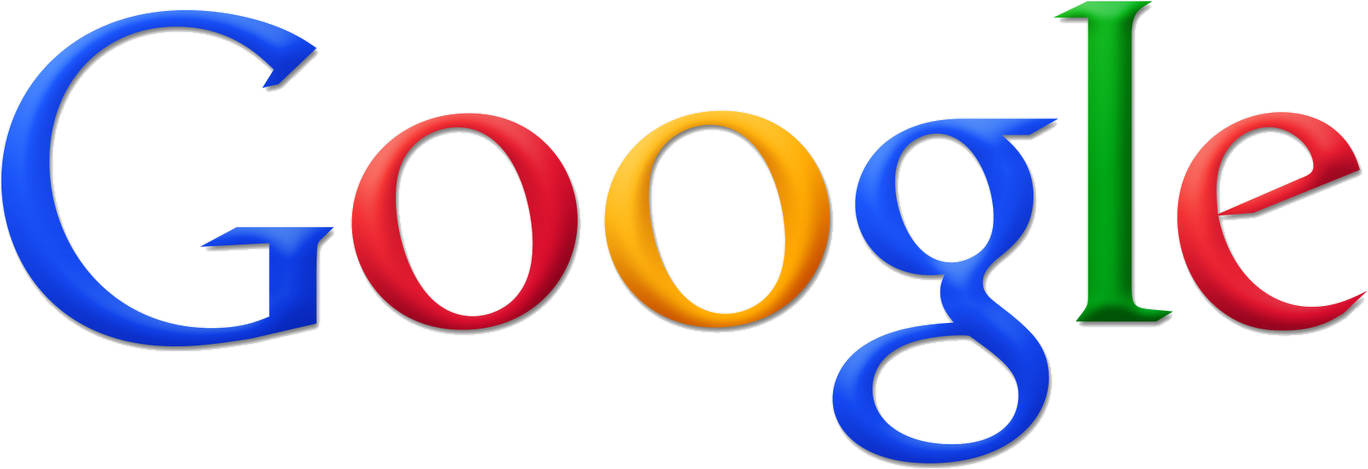
Google logotype designed by Ruth Kedar reminds us of Mondrian minimalism. Kedar has emphasized the playfulness of her design, and its simplicity that conveys an illusion of non-design. According to her, "The colors evoke memories of child play, but deftly stray from the color wheel strictures so as to hint to the inherent element of serendipity creeping into any search results page.... The texture and shading of each letter is done in an unobtrusive way, resulting in lifting it from the page while giving it both weight and lightness."

=== Web design ===
Graphic design is used to make a website understandable, memorable, and attractive to the end user as well to present its content in a user-friendly fashion. Web design is closely tied to user interface design and user experience design, since aesthetics impact how viewers perceive and interact with the content of a website.

According to designer Armin Vit, even though websites differ from other types of design projects, the same principles of graphic design apply: "How do you render information in a manner that is understandable, memorable and pleasing to the end user?... Yet, when it comes to web design it's rare that all elements — functionality, clarity of information, and subjective beauty — come together to create a result that is widely admired, recognized or lauded in the same vein as anything resembling the likes of Saul Bass’ AT&T logo, or Susan Kare's icons for the original Mac OS".

Computer scientist Tim Berners-Lee, known for inventing the web in 1980s, used it to link academic papers electronically and correspond with people in laboratories around the world through the Internet. He is credited with the construction of the first website in August 1991.

The Mosaic web browser, launched in 1993, was the first browser that integrated text and multimedia, creating opportunities for development of a graphical user interface. CSS, a standardized markup language that allowed for graphic design elements like fonts, colors, and layout to be a part of a website, was proposed by Håkon Wium Lie in 1994. The first standardized specifications for CSS, called CSS1, were adopted by World Wide Web Consortium in 1996. Internet Explorer by Microsoft became the first commercial browser to support CSS.

== Design in Modern Culture ==
=== Modern graphic design ===
In the second half of the 19th century, William Morris's Kelmscott Press produced many historicist graphic designs and created a collectors market for this kind of art. In Oxford he associated with artists like Edward Burne-Jones and Dante Gabriel Rossetti. Together they formed the Pre-Raphaelite Brotherhood, and their ideas influenced modern graphic design considerably.

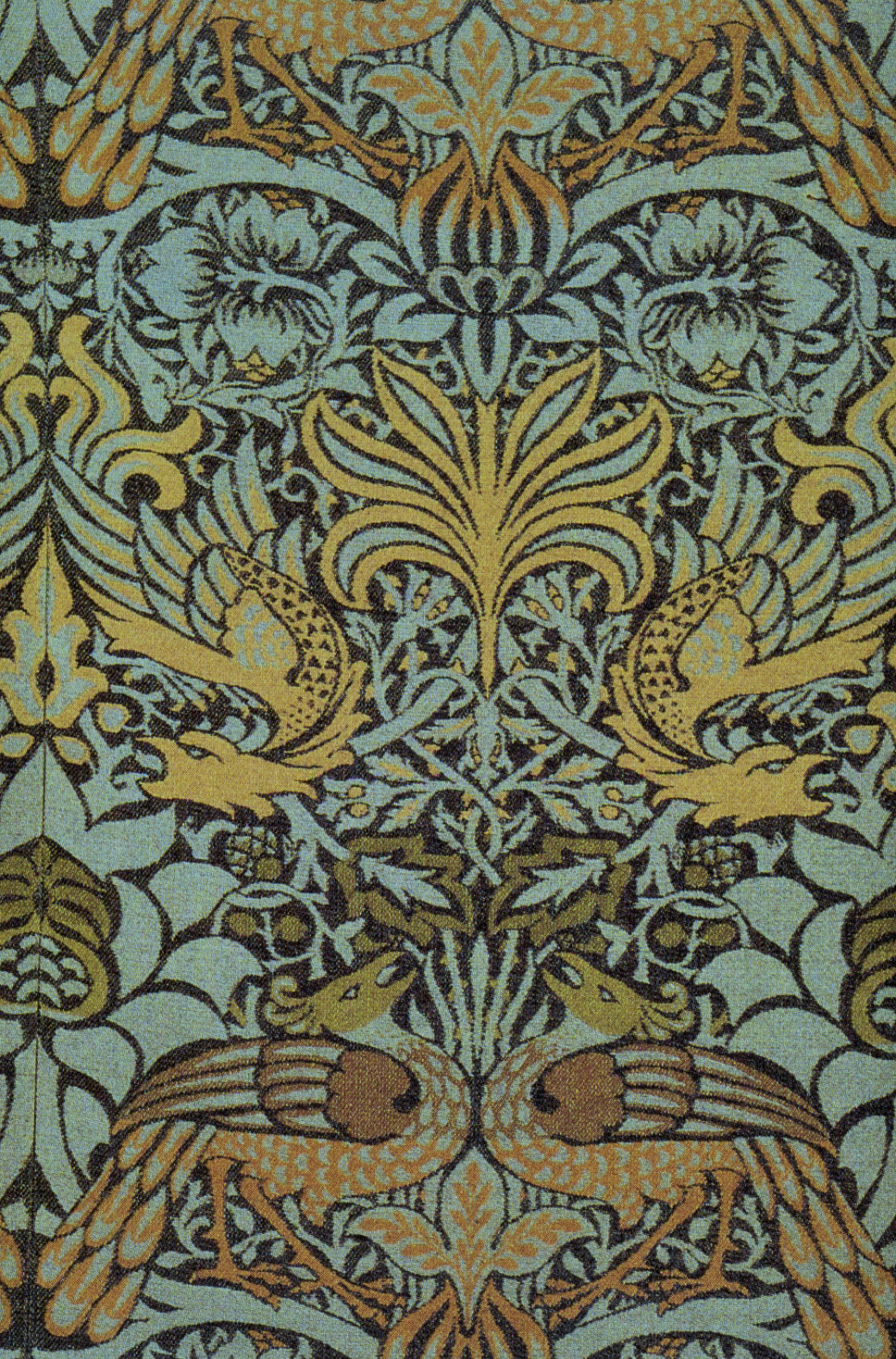
Fabric design Peacock and Dragon by William Morris (1878), an example of decorative graphic design. Such designs were revived during the 1960s with the emergence of the hippie movement.

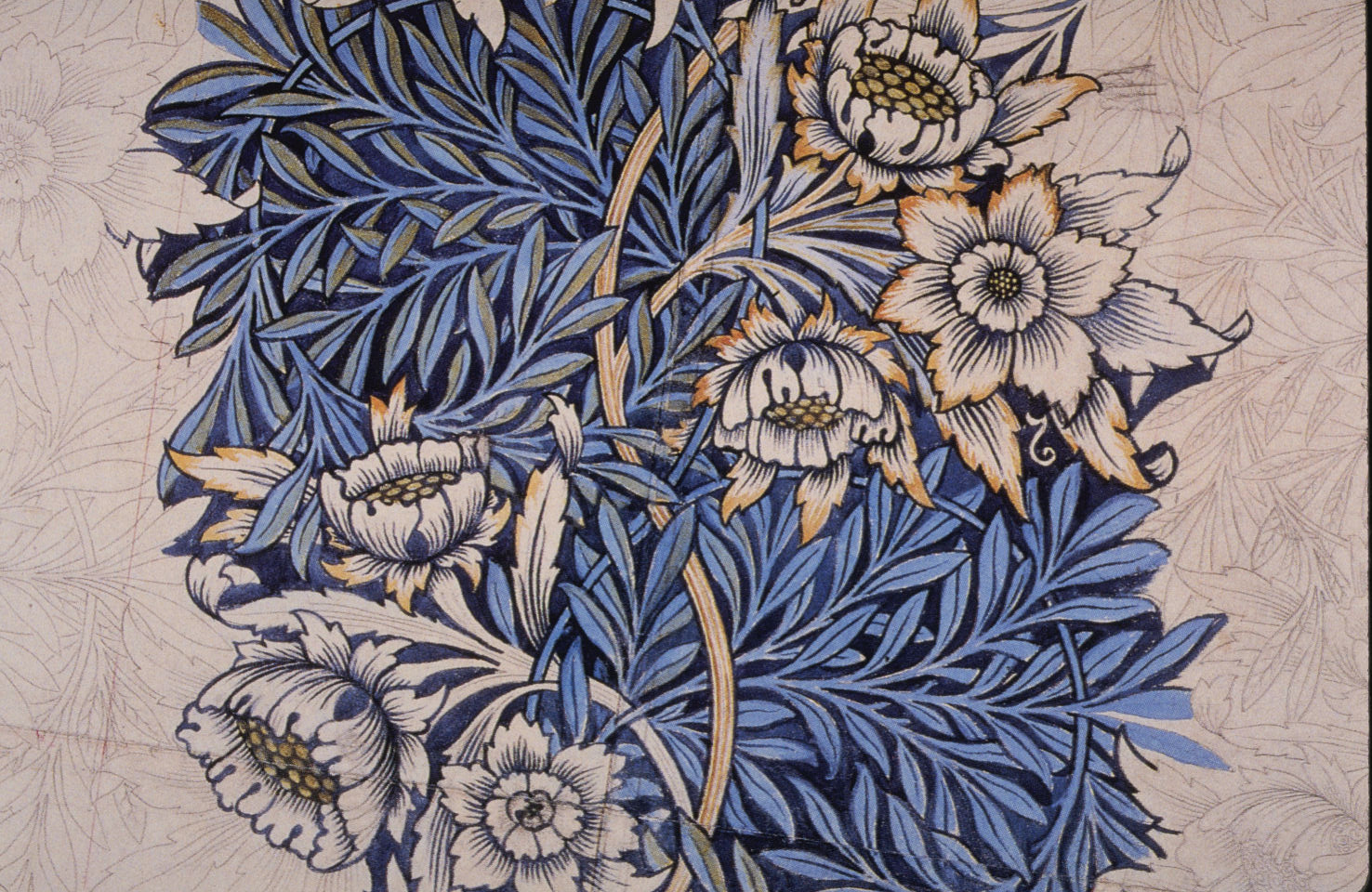
This Morris Tulip and Willow design (1873) is another example of decorative graphics. By using a diagonal blue, with only some suggestion of orange, the artist tries to create a harmonious color scheme that could be used effectively in the design of a poster or other graphic design media.

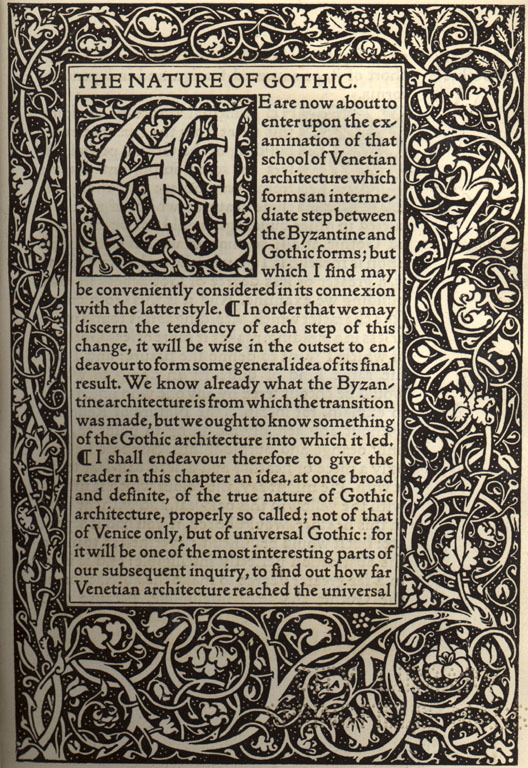
The first page of The Nature of Gothic by John Ruskin, which was published by Morris' Kelmscott Press. The decorative design was the revival of the Gothic style in graphic design.

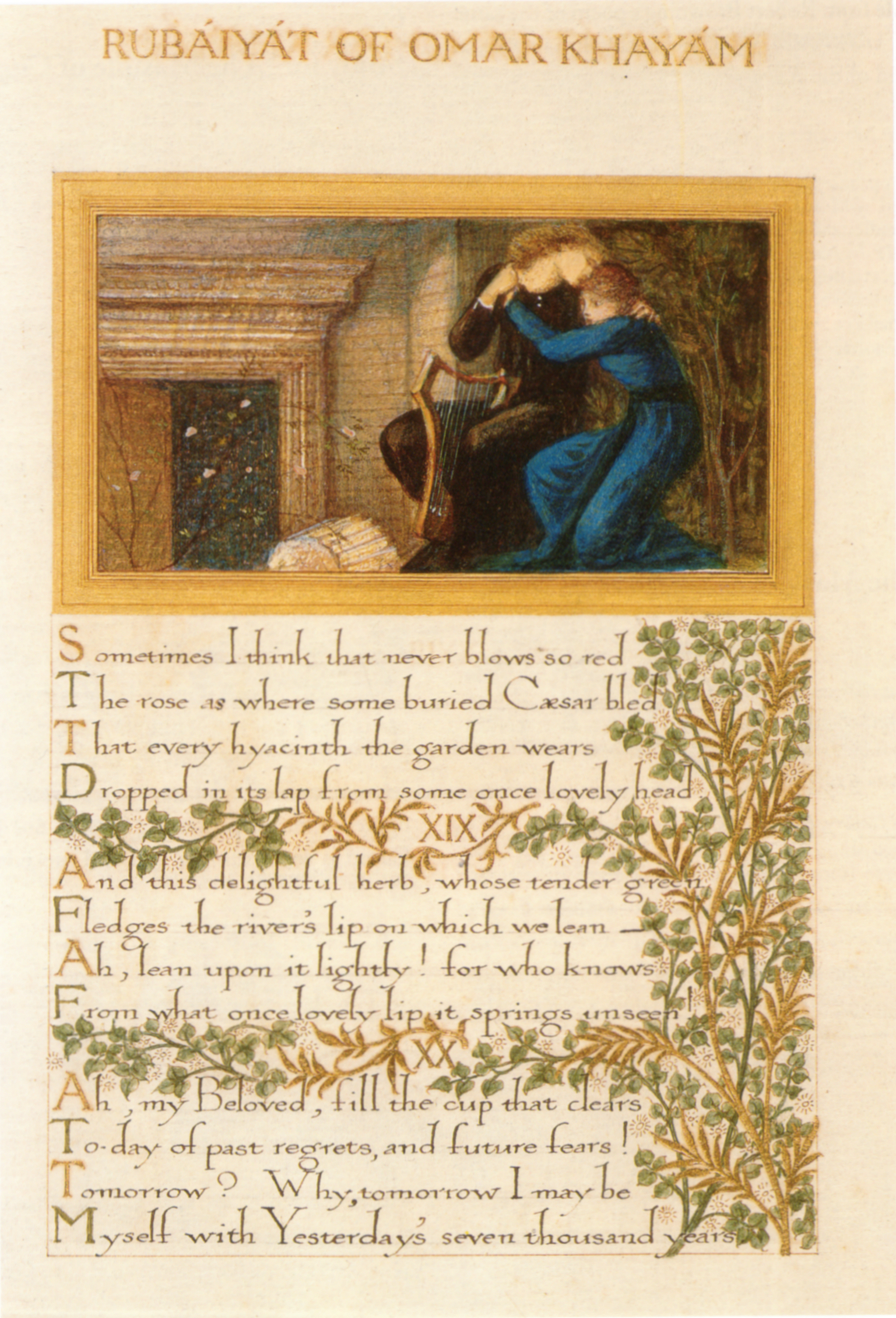
Rubaiyat, a book of poetry by Persian poet Omar Khayyam, an example of early modern graphic design cooperation. The graphic composition of calligraphy and its decorative design are by Morris and the painting is by Burne-Jones.

In 1917, Frederick H. Meyer, director and instructor at the California School of Arts and Crafts, taught a class entitled “Graphic Design and Lettering”.

=== Comics and graphic novels ===
A comic refers to a magazine or book of narrative artwork and, virtually always, dialog and descriptive prose. Despite the term, the subject matter in comics is not necessarily humorous; in fact, it is often serious and action-oriented. Due to the fact that graphic design constitutes the main foundation of comics, it plays a crucial role in conveying various narratives through its compositional devices, line drawings, and colouring scheme.

Superman is widely considered to be an American cultural icon. Created by American writer Jerry Siegel and Canadian-born artist Joe Shuster in 1932, the character first appeared in Action Comics in 1938. The character's appearance is distinctive and iconic: a red, blue, and yellow costume, complete with a cape and a stylized "S" shield on his chest.

Selecting the old-fashioned comic book as subject matter, Roy Lichtenstein used the splash page of a romance story drawn by Tony Abruzzo and lettered by Ira Schnapp in Secret Hearts #83 (Nov. 1962), and slightly reworked the art and dialogue by re-lettering Schnapp's original word balloon. This precise composition, titled Drowning Girl, (1963), is now part of the permanent collection of the Museum of Modern Art, New York.

=== Modern life ===
Today graphic design has penetrated into all aspects of modern life. In particular modern architecture has been influenced by graphics.

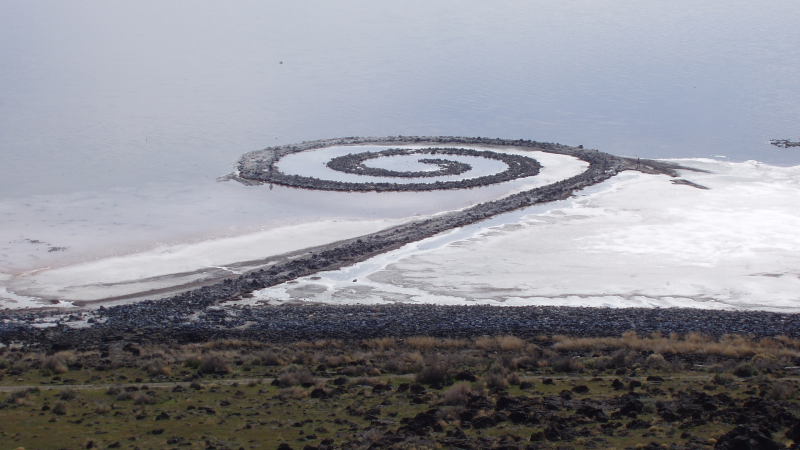
Robert Smithson's monumental graphic art earthwork Spiral Jetty (1970) is located on the Great Salt Lake in Utah. Using black basalt rocks and earth from the site, the artist created an artistic composition in the translucent red water with a graphic design 1,500 feet long and 15 feet wide.

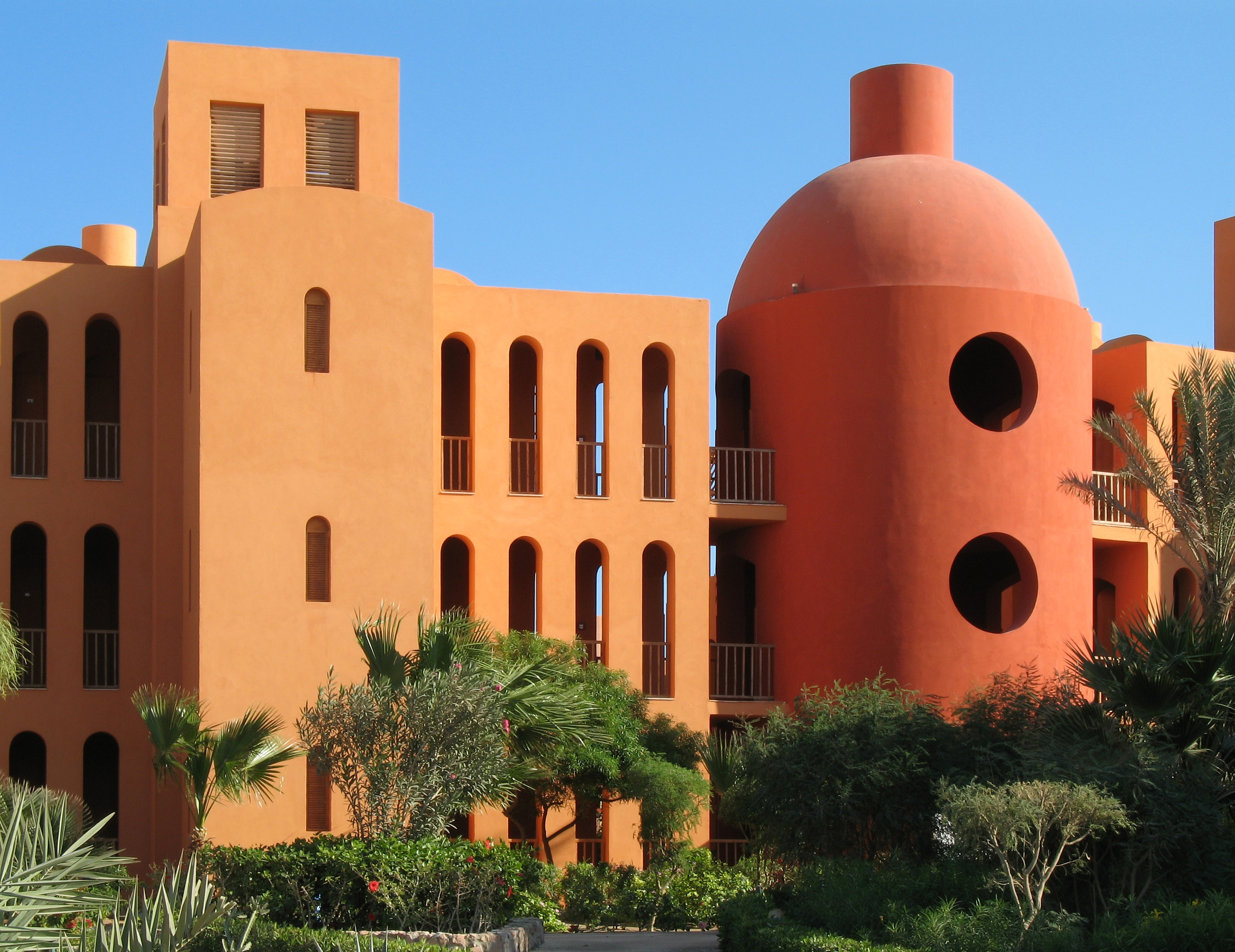
In the architectural design of the Steigenberger Hotel in El Gouna, Egypt, the minimalist design with 3-D geometric composition, and monochromatic coloring scheme provides graphical compositions from various angles.
