= Copy slip =

Copy slips or copy strips are small slips of paper which were commonly used to teach calligraphy and penmanship between 1500 and 1920. The strips, which typically measure about 8.5 inches (22 cm) by 3.5 inches (8.9 cm), display engraved or handwritten examples of calligraphy or good penmanship. Copy strips were commonly stored by tying them into a packet or placing them in an envelope.

The collections of individual copy slip papers developed into copybooks. Copybooks contained examples of calligraphy or basic penmanship with blank lines below for students to imitate the printed text and develop their penmanship skills.

The most widely published set of 19th century copy slips was George Gaskell’s Complete Compendium of Elegant Writing. Louis Madarasz, the highly skilled American calligrapher, developed ornamental penmanship talents during his teens with Gaskell's Compendium of Penmanship.
