= Louis Madarasz =

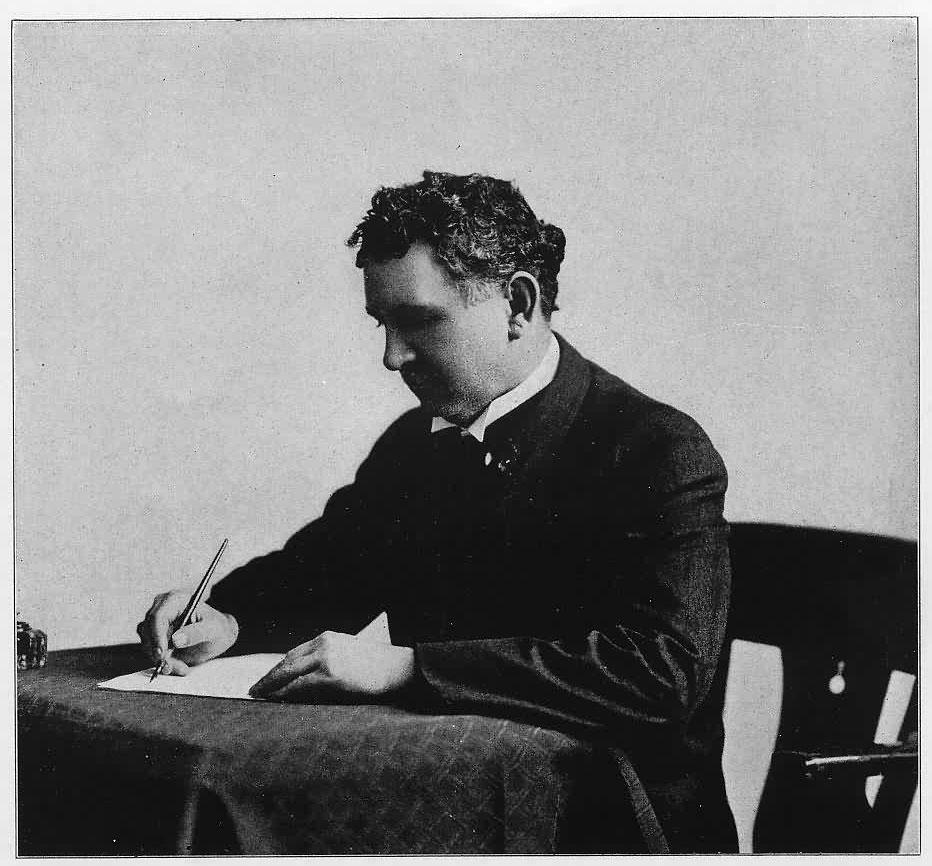
Louis Madarasz

Louis Madarasz (January 20, 1859 – December 23, 1910) was an American calligrapher, born in San Antonio, Texas, regarded as one of the most highly skilled ornamental penmen of all time.

== Biography ==
=== Early life ===
Madarasz was born in Texas in 1859. His parents were Hungarian immigrants who came to the U.S. because of the Hungarian Revolution of 1848. He obtained a copy of Gaskell's Compendium of Penmanship when he was in his teens. Studying the text by himself, he achieved a degree of skill in ornamental writing that was remarkable for one so young.

In the late 1870s, he enrolled as a student at the Rochester Business University in Rochester, New York. While attending this institution, he began to acquire a reputation for penmanship by selling hand-written calling cards at a public arcade. During the years that followed, Madarasz took on penmanship positions at a number of institutions, including G. A. Gaskell's penmanship school in Manchester, New Hampshire. Besides being an accomplished master penman, Gaskell was also a businessman who recognized advertising opportunities. Madarasz, whose fame as a penman was fairly widespread by this time, also recognized the opportunity to further his own skills by being associated with Gaskell. Soon the famous signature of Madarasz appeared on the advertisements for Gaskell's Compendium. Madarasz stayed with Gaskell for several years, learning much about advertising and the business of mail order.

=== Professional career ===
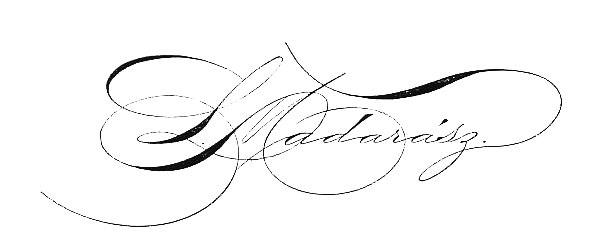
Louis Madarasz's signature.

After leaving Gaskell's, Madarasz worked in Sterling, Illinois; Jersey City, New Jersey; and Poughkeepsie, New York. His speed of execution was reputed to be faster than any penman, before or since. His style was unique – a dramatic, rather heavily shaded variety of ornamental writing.

In 1908-1909, Madarasz sold books of his own penmanship to earn money. He purchased large, new scrapbooks of two hundred pages each, and filled each page of the books with his own penmanship. To do this, he copied his own business letters, correspondence, writing lessons and display writing, and pasted them, one by one, upon each page. He advertised them as the Madarasz Scrapbooks, and sold them for $45. Two of the original scrapbooks are known to be in existence today.: the largest scrapbook, 175 pages, is owned by the International Association of Master Penman, Engrossers, and Teachers of Handwriting (IAMPETH); the other scrapbook is in the archives of the Newberry Library in Chicago, Illinois.

In addition to his penmanship, Madarasz enjoyed chess and other board games. He also enjoyed the theater, not only as a spectator, but as an actor. He once studied under a professional thespian and had a part in a stage performance.

=== Later life ===
The last few years of Madarasz's life were spent in a business association in Goldfield, Nevada. According to The Secret of the Skill of Madarasz, a book published by the Zaner-Bloser Company in 1911, "He passed away quietly on December 23, 1910, having on the day he was stricken written a Christmas greeting in that beautiful clean cut style of penmanship which has been copied by so many thousand aspirants during the past thirty years."

At his request, his body was cremated. His ashes rest in the columbarium at Fresh Pond, Long Island, New York.

== Works ==
- Artistic Gems in Ornamental Penmanship (1914, published posthumously)
- Lessons In Advanced Engraver's Script Penmanship (1914, published posthumously)
- Louis Madarasz His Life & Works Compiled by Dr. Joseph M. Vitolo, 2014
