= Zaner–Bloser (teaching script) =

Teaching script for handwriting

Script sample

The Zaner–Bloser (also Zaner–Bloser Method) is a teaching script for handwriting based on Latin script as well as a system of penmanship instruction, which originated around 1904 at the Zanerian College of Penmanship in Columbus, Ohio. Charles P. Zaner (1864–1918) and Elmer W. Bloser (1865–1929), originally a Spencerian Method instructor, developed their teaching script with the aim of allowing learners an easier transition from print writing to cursive. The Zaner–Bloser Method first teaches block letters and then cursive in order to enable written expression as quickly as possible and thus develop the ability to write. Material relating to the method of instruction practiced by Zaner and Bloser is still being published by the Zaner-Bloser Company, a subsidiary of Highlights for Children.

== Characteristics ==
The Zaner–Bloser alphabet comprises two different sets of letters for handwriting – one for print writing (sometimes also called "manuscript printing"), and one for cursive writing. Zaner–Bloser letters are written straight up and down in print and slanted in cursive. In D'Nealian, for comparison, just 13 letters change shape between print and cursive, and the slant does not change at all.

== Development ==
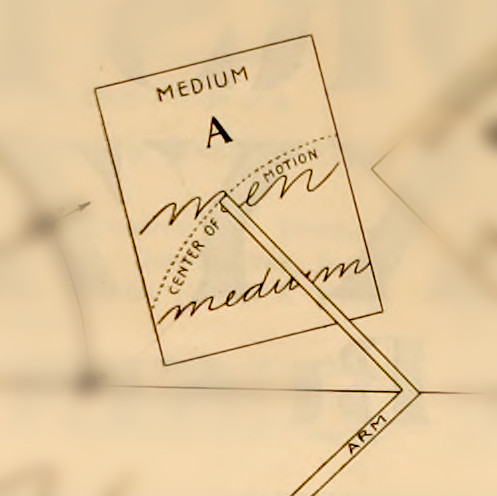
Detail from Zaner's 1896 article: The Line of Direction in Writing

A major factor contributing to the development of the Zaner–Bloser teaching script was Zaner's study of the body movements required to create the form of cursive letters when using the 'muscular arm method' of handwriting – such as the Palmer Method – which was prevalent in the United States from the late 19th century. The Palmer Method had been developed around 1888 as a simplification of the then-established elaborate Spencerian Method and had quickly become the most popular handwriting system in the US.

Zaner considered the hinge action of the forearm as the 'central energy of movement' and that its relation to the direction of writing, or page angle, could affect letter form and the effort required. By changing from a page angle which placed letter down strokes on a line towards the center of the body, as other educators advised, Zaner offered a means to link muscle effort with balanced (medium), condensed (compact style), or extended (running hand) letter forms.

In most styles of cursive handwriting that existed in Zaner's time, the fingers used to support and steady the hand on the page for arm movement were fixed in relation to the pen (a typical instruction to writers according to the Palmer Method was that "the nails of the third and fourth fingers should rest lightly on the paper, and should follow the course of the pen in every direction"). In order to simplify the process of writing by hand, Zaner analysed how professional users of the then-existing handwriting styles used their 'rest' fingers to control movement. For writing lower case letters, Zaner recommended a technique of letting the little finger slide to the right in making up strokes, but to rest or drag for down strokes in order to improve control of the arm movement. This required the joints of the 'rest' fingers to act on the down strokes, independent of those holding the pen, which Zaner termed as 'hand action'. Zaner's studies and Bloser's contributions gave rise to a simplified ('streamlined') form of the script used in the Palmer Method.

== Prevalence ==
By the mid-20th century, the Zaner–Bloser Method was the most popular style of penmanship instruction in the US, while interest in the Palmer Method had been declining from the 1950s.

Use of the Zaner–Bloser Method declined after 1978, when the D'Nealian Method was introduced. The D'Nealian Method sought to further alleviate the difficulties of the transition from print writing to cursive writing by returning to a more cursive style based on the script of the Palmer Method with block letters that have many similarities with their cursive counterparts.

It has been claimed that close to 90% of US schoolchildren who follow the traditional print-then-cursive route to handwriting are taught either the Zaner–Bloser or the D'Nealian alphabet.

== Publishing ==
In 1895, the Zanerian College of Penmanship in Columbus, Ohio, became known as the Zaner-Bloser Company, which continues to sell instruction materials for handwriting, reading, writing, spelling and vocabulary training. Since 1972, Zaner-Bloser has been a subsidiary of Highlights for Children.

== See also ==
- Spencerian script, a US teaching script
- Palmer script, a US teaching script
- D'Nealian script, a US teaching script
- Getty-Dubay Italic script, a US teaching script
- BFH script, a US teaching script
- Regional handwriting variation
