= E. C. Mills =

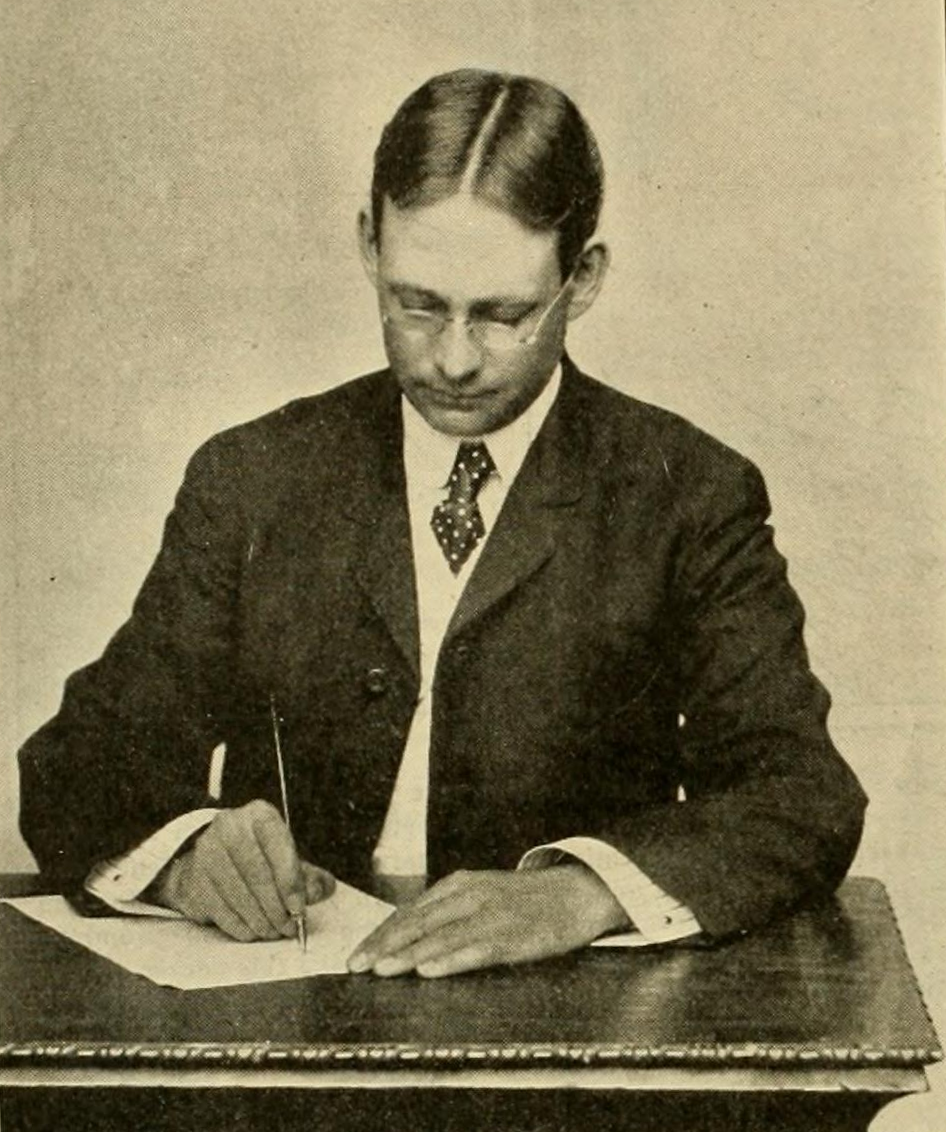
- Born: February 10, 1873; Bushnell, Illinois, United States
- Died: May 24, 1962 (aged 89); Rochester, New York, United States
- Occupation(s): Master Penman and Business Educator
- Known for: Business Writing style

Signature
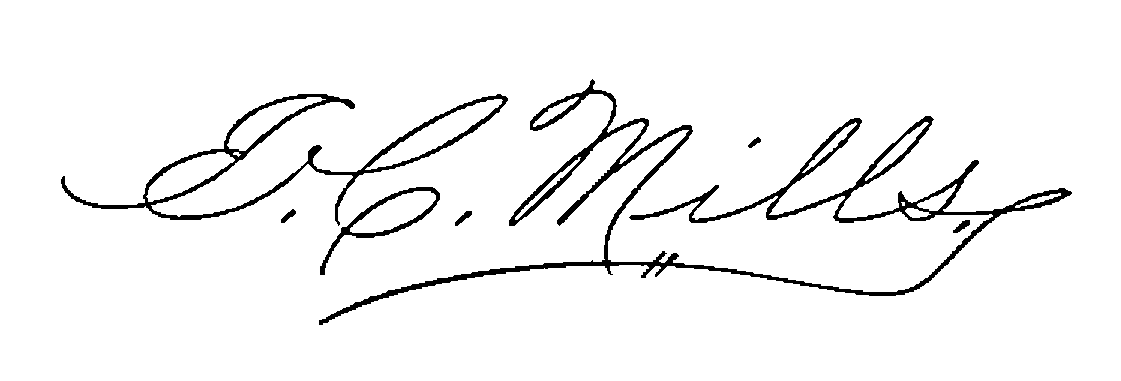

Edward Clarence Mills (also Edward C. Mills) (1873–1962) was an American master penman and educator, noted for the Business Writing style of cursive handwriting.

== Life and background ==
Mills was born on February 10, 1873, in Bushnell, Illinois, the youngest of eight children by William and Rachel (Haines). He married Grace Arter in 1894, and they had two daughters, Florence and Cecile. He died May 24, 1962, in Rochester, New York.

His penmanship began with inspiration from a Gaskell's compendium and guidance by C. N. Crandle who taught in Bushnell. He entered the Denver Business College aged 15 and, in addition to taking a business course, addressed circulars and assisted with penmanship. On returning to Bushnell he taught at the Western Normal College for five years, then became head of their commercial department in 1895. Around 1896 he moved to Rochester, New York, contributing penwork to the publishers William & Rogers for textbooks. After the publisher was sold to the American Book Company, Mills embarked on his own education and script services, regularly advertising correspondence courses.

Mills contracted typhoid in 1904, requiring some of his journal contributions to be continued by Clyde C. Lister during his convalescence into 1905. By 1909 he was an instructor in penmanship for commercial teacher training at the Rochester Business institute.

From 1910 to 1925 he supervised penmanship for Rochester schools, however, the exacting proportion required in the Mills system lost emphasis in the city schools on his retirement. These schools moved to the Noble & Noble penmanship technique that was less demanding of precision in achieving legibility.

== Business writing style ==
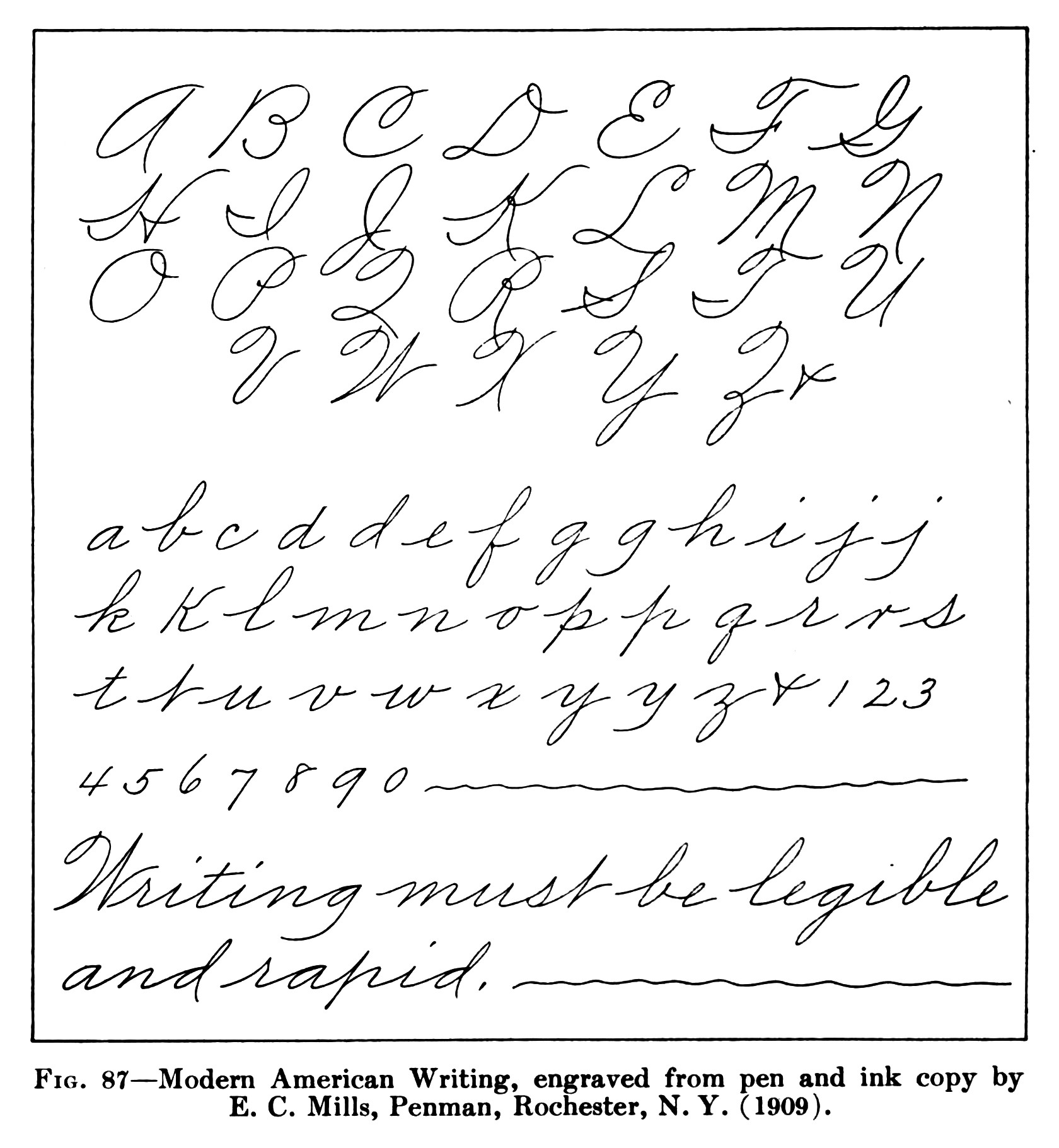
Business Writing style exemplar by E. C. Mills 1909

A cursive handwriting for commerce was developed around 1880 in the United States, emerging from such ornamental styles as Spencerian script, designed for rapid writing using arm movement. This hand was simpler in form, having no flourishing or shading (i.e., variation in line width from pen pressure or nib shape), to meet the demand of business for rapid legible writing that could be sustained for long periods.

Among others, including A. N. Palmer, Mills gave instruction and created copybooks for this functional style. However, in terms of rendering its form in pen and ink, "E. C. Mills was the undisputed master of Business Writing … and in fifty years of service as a penman, he set the standards by which business writing was judged", according to master Spencerian penman Michael Sull.

=== Mills system ===
A series of writing exercises were presented for students to develop their skills in rapid penmanship of the business writing style, which he also termed: page writing, body writing, and miscellaneous word writing. Similar exercises featured in most business writing courses of the era. Mills's business writing was based on the muscular arm movement, first published as the Palmer Method; forearms resting on a horizontal surface, the wrist of the writing hand raised from the page, and the pen controlled using the arm instead of fingers; commonly promoted at the time to reduce hand fatigue and to which Mills referred as free arm movement. He emphasized holding the wrist of the writing hand nearly flat to have the arm best act upon the muscles forward of the elbow. Exercises to help students acquire this movement began with drills of push-pull (oblique) strokes directed using the middle of the body and ovals made by rolling on the forearm muscles. Gradually letter forms were introduced based on the 'correct' movement followed by extensive repetition intended to instil muscle memory for rapid writing.

In a set of books for schools published on his system, Mills regarded the "quality of line, slant, spacing and formation of letters" as essential to good writing. He advised bringing the end stoke of each word up to the height of the letter 'm' with a pause in a "firm finish" to aid control and formation. Copy exercises usually began with stroke drills related to each letter; for example, ovals for a capital 'C' and obliques for a lowercase 'l'; in keeping with the system's emphasis on acquiring the desired arm movement for speed and letter form.

== Publications ==
By 1895 while employed at Western Normal College, Bushnell, he had published Mills's Compendium of Vertical Writing, and in an advertisement described how each copy of penwork was accompanied by directions "telling just what motion to use".

Mills produced other copybooks and also wrote articles for periodicals such as the Penman's Art Journal:

- Vertical or Slanting Writing? (1896)
- Lessons in Rapid Business Writing (1897)
- Helps [sic] for Beginners (1898)
- The Mills System of Business Writing (1903) Nos. 1–8
- Modern Business Penmanship (1903)
- Mills's Lessons in Business Writing (1904–1906)
- Advanced Course in Business Writing (1909–1910)
- New Modern Illustrative Bookkeeping, Introductory Course (1918)
- Ideal Business Writing (1925–1926)
