= Getty-Dubay Italic =

Modern teaching script

Script sample

Getty-Dubay Italic is a modern teaching script for handwriting based on Latin script, developed in 1976 in Portland, Oregon, by Barbara Getty and Inga Dubay with the aim of allowing learners to make an easier transition from print writing to cursive.

== Characteristics ==
Getty-Dubay Italic is designed as a semi-cursive Italic script. Other than strokes to join the letters, only the lower-case letter 'k' and a few upper-case letters have forms different from their printed equivalents. Getty-Dubay Italic is written with a slant of 85 degrees, measured counterclockwise from the baseline.

== Prevalence ==
It has been claimed that about one-third of US homeschoolers (and about 7% of US schoolchildren generally) now learn Getty-Dubay Italic rather than conventional manuscript-then-cursive handwriting styles.

== Publishing ==
Getty-Dubay Italic books were previously published by Portland State University and are now self-published by the authors and Allport Editions.

== See also ==
- Spencerian script, a US teaching script
- Palmer script, a US teaching script
- D'Nealian script, a US teaching script
- Zaner-Bloser script, a US teaching script
- BFH script, a US teaching script
- Regional handwriting variation
