= Penmanship =

Technique of writing with the hand

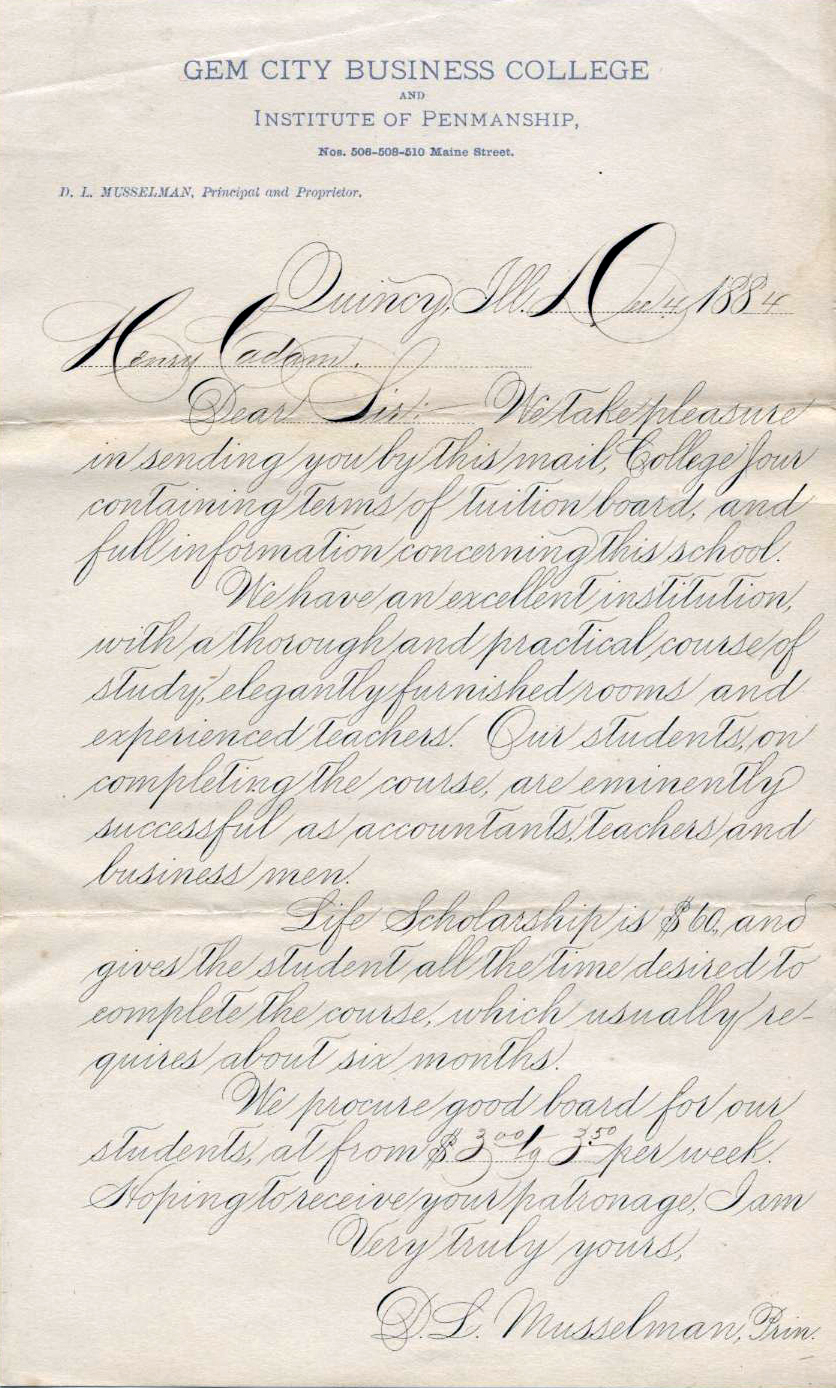
Example of Spencerian script from 1884

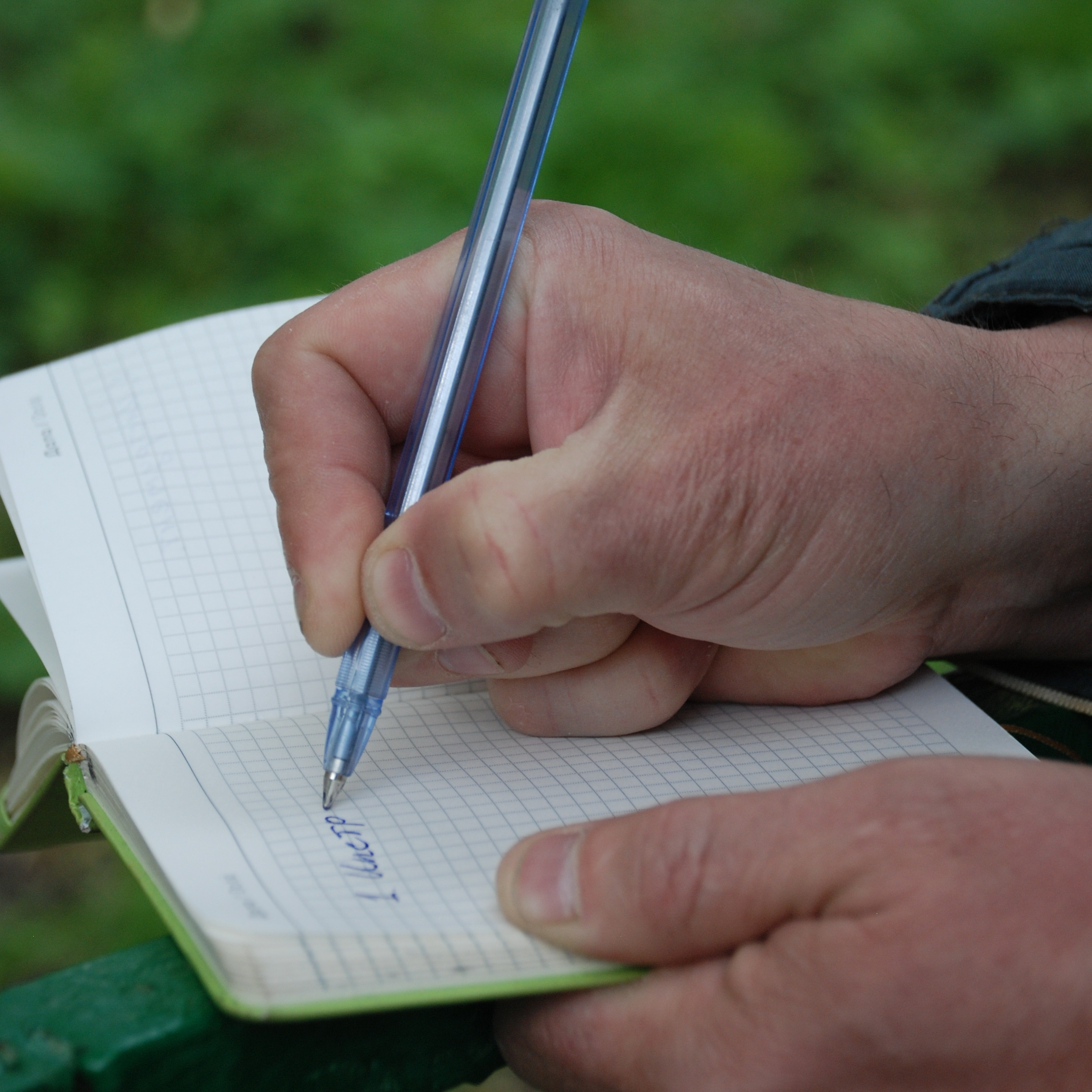
A thin object (pen), held with three fingers, allows one to draw thin lines.

Penmanship is the technique of writing with the hand using a writing instrument. Today, this is most commonly done with a pen, or pencil, but throughout history has included many different implements. The various generic and formal historical styles of writing are called hands while an individual's style of penmanship is referred to as handwriting.

== History ==
=== Origins ===
The earliest example of systematic writing is the Sumerian pictographic system found on clay tablets, which eventually developed around 3200 BC into a modified version called cuneiform which was impressed on wet clay with a sharpened reed. This form of writing eventually evolved into an ideographic system (where a sign represents an idea) and then to a syllabic system (where a sign represents a syllable). Developing around the same time, the Egyptian system of hieroglyphics also began as a pictographic script and evolved into a system of syllabic writing. Two cursive scripts were eventually created, hieratic, shortly after hieroglyphs were invented, and demotic (Egyptian) in the seventh century BC. Scribes wrote these scripts usually on papyrus, with ink on a reed pen.

The first known alphabetical system came from the Phoenicians, who developed a vowel-less system of 22 letters around the eleventh century BC. The Greeks eventually adapted the Phoenician alphabet around the eighth century BC. Adding vowels to the alphabet, dropping some consonants and altering the order, the Ancient Greeks developed a script which included only what we know of as capital Greek letters. The lowercase letters of Classical Greek were a later invention of the Middle Ages. The Phoenician alphabet also influenced the Hebrew and Aramaic scripts, which follow a vowel-less system. One Hebrew script was only used for religious literature and by a small community of Samaritans up until the sixth century BC. Aramaic was the official script of the Babylonian, Assyrian and Persian empires and 'Square Hebrew' (the script now used in Israel) developed from Aramaic around the third century AD.

=== Handwriting based on Latin script ===
The Romans in Southern Italy eventually adopted the Greek alphabet as modified by the Etruscans to develop Latin writing. Like the Greeks, the Romans employed stone, metal, clay, and papyrus as writing surfaces. Handwriting styles which were used to produce manuscripts included square capitals, rustic capitals, uncials, and half-uncials. Square capitals were employed for more-formal texts based on stone inscriptional letters, while rustic capitals freer, compressed, and efficient. Uncials were rounded capitals (majuscules) that originally were developed by the Greeks in the third century BC, but became popular in Latin manuscripts by the fourth century AD. Roman cursive or informal handwriting started out as a derivative of the capital letters, though the tendency to write quickly and efficiently made the letters less precise. Half-uncials (minuscules) were lowercase letters, which eventually became the national hand of Ireland. Other combinations of half-uncial and cursive handwriting developed throughout Europe, including Visigothic, and Merovingian.

At the end of the eighth century, Charlemagne decreed that all writings in his empire were to be written in a standard handwriting, which came to be known as Carolingian minuscule. Alcuin of York was commissioned by Charlemagne to create this new handwriting, which he did in collaboration with other scribes and based on the tradition of other Roman handwriting. Carolingian minuscule was used to produce many of the manuscripts from monasteries until the eleventh century and most lower-case letters of today's European scripts derive from it.

Gothic or black-letter script, evolved from Carolingian, became the dominant handwriting from the twelfth century until the Italian Renaissance (1400–1600 AD). This script was not as clear as the Carolingian, but instead was narrower, darker, and denser. Because of this, the dot above the i was added in order to differentiate it from the similar pen strokes of the n, m, and u. Also, the letter u was created as separate from the v, which had previously been used for both sounds. Part of the reason for such compact handwriting was to save space, since parchment was expensive. Gothic script, being the writing style of scribes in Germany when Gutenberg invented movable type, became the model for the first typeface. Another variation of Carolingian minuscule was created by the Italian humanists in the fifteenth century, called by them littera antiqua and now called humanist minuscule. This was a combination of Roman capitals and the rounded version of Carolingian minuscule. A cursive form eventually developed, and it became increasingly slanted due to the quickness with which it could be written. This manuscript handwriting, called cursive humanistic, became known as the typeface Italic used throughout Europe.

Copperplate engraving influenced handwriting as it allowed penmanship copybooks to be more widely printed. Copybooks first appeared in Italy around the sixteenth century; the earliest writing manuals were published by Sigismondo Fanti and Ludovico degli Arrighi. Other manuals were produced by Dutch and French writing masters later in the century, including Pierre Hamon. However, copybooks only became commonplace in England with the invention of copperplate engraving. Engraving could better produce the flourishes in handwritten script, which helped penmanship masters to produce beautiful examples for students. Some of these early penmanship manuals included those of Edward Cocker, John Seddon, and John Ayer. By the eighteenth century, schools were established to teach penmanship techniques from master penmen, especially in England and the United States. Penmanship became part of the curriculum in American schools by the early 1900s, rather than just reserved for specialty schools teaching adults penmanship as a professional skill. Several different penmanship methods have been developed and published, including Spencerian, Getty-Dubay, Barchowsky Fluent Handwriting, Icelandic (Italic), Zaner-Bloser, and D’Nealian methods among others used in American education.

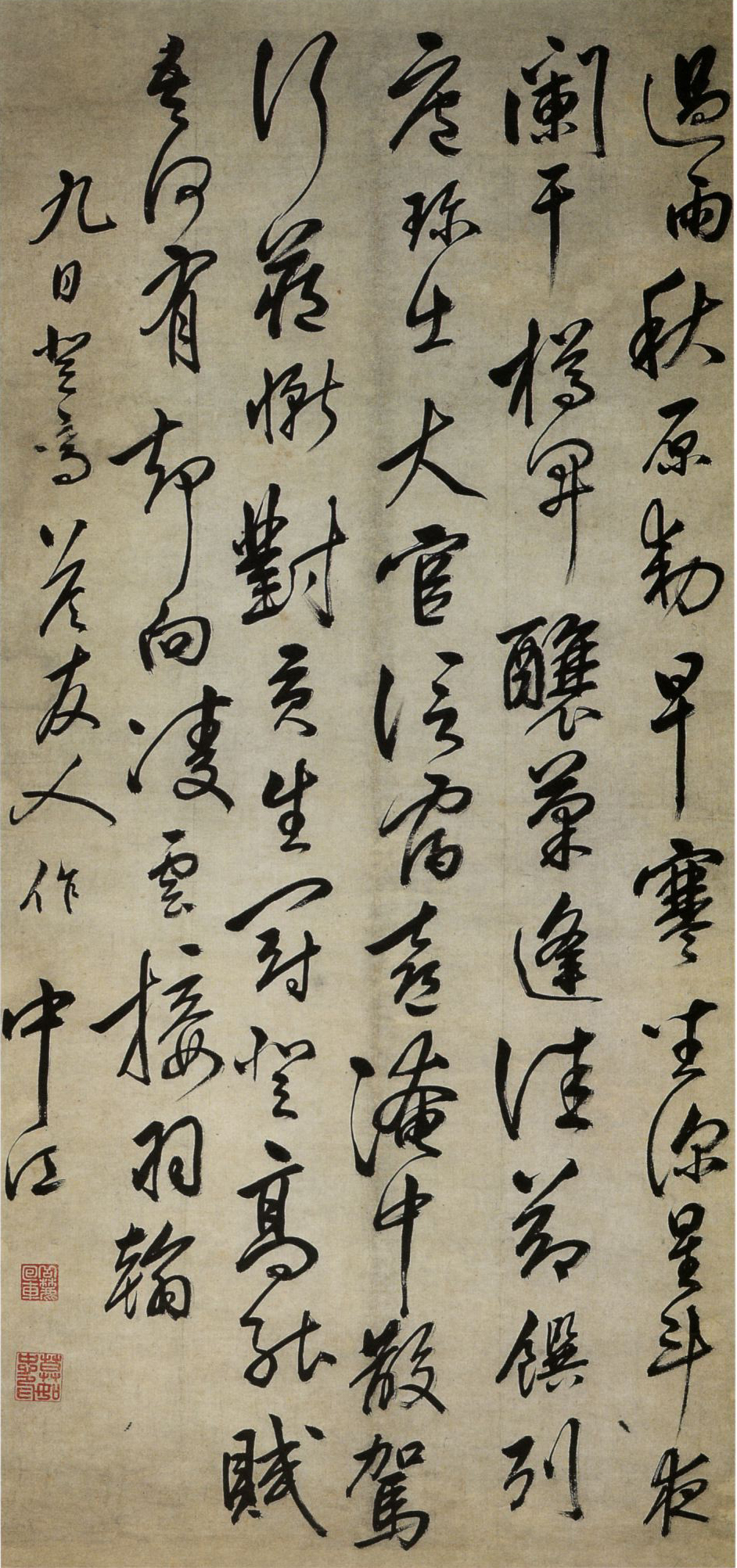
Example of semi-cursive style Chinese calligraphy

=== Handwriting based on Chinese script ===
Writing systems developed in East Asia include Chinese and Japanese writing systems. Chinese characters represent whole morphemes rather than individual sounds, and consequently are visually far more complex than European scripts; in some cases their pictographic origins are still visible. The earliest form of Chinese was written on bones and shells (called Jiaguwen) in the fourteenth century BC. Other writing surfaces used during this time included bronze, stone, jade, pottery, and clay, which became more popular after the twelfth century BC. Greater Seal script (Dazhuan) flourished during 1100 BC and 700 BC and appeared mainly in bronze vessels. Lesser Seal script (Xiaozhuan) is the precursor of modern complex Chinese script, which is more stylized than the Greater Seal.

Chinese handwriting is considered an art, more so than illuminated manuscripts in Western culture. Calligraphy is widely practiced in China, which employs scripts such as Kaishu (standard), Xingshu (semi-cursive), and Caoshu (cursive). Chinese calligraphy is meant to represent the artistic personality in a way western calligraphy cannot, and therefore penmanship is valued higher than in any other nation. Standard Script (Kaishu) is main traditional script used today.

Japanese writing evolved from Chinese script and Chinese characters, called kanji, or ideograms, were adopted to represent Japanese words and grammar. Kanji were simplified to create two other scripts, called hiragana and katakana. Hiragana is the more widely used script in Japan today, while katakana, meant for formal documents originally, is used similarly to italics in alphabetic scripts.

== Teaching methods and history ==
=== Books used in North America ===
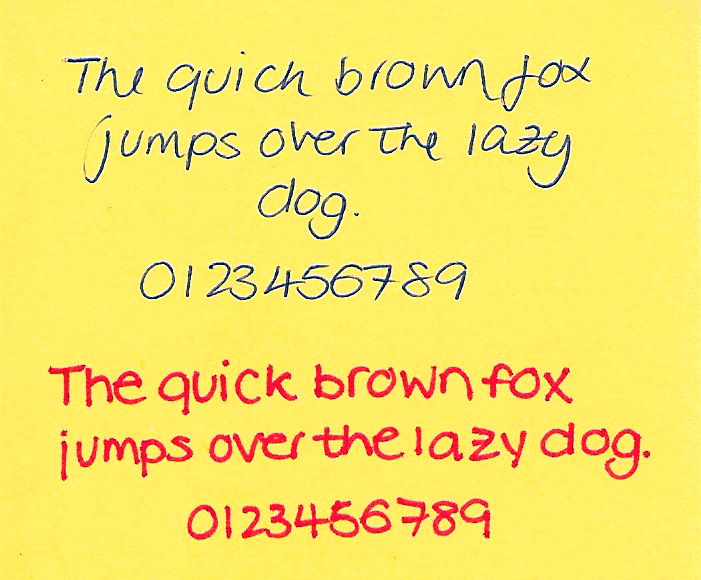
'The quick brown fox jumps over the lazy dog', written by two different hands

Platt Rogers Spencer is known as the "Father of American Penmanship". His writing system was first published in 1848, in his book Spencer and Rice's System of Business and Ladies' Penmanship. The most popular Spencerian manual was The Spencerian Key to Practical Penmanship, published by his sons in 1866. This "Spencerian Method" Ornamental Style was taught in American schools until the mid-1920s, and has seen a resurgence in recent years through charter schools and home schooling using revised Spencerian books and methods produced by former IAMPETH president Michael Sull (born 1946).

George A. Gaskell (1845–1886), a student of Spencer, authored two popular books on penmanship, Gaskell's Complete Compendium of Elegant Writing and The Penman's Hand-Book (1883). Louis Henry Hausam published the "New Education in Penmanship" in 1908, called "the greatest work of the kind ever published."

Many copybooks were produced in North America at the start of the 20th century, mostly for Business Style penmanship (a simplified form of Ornamental Style). These included those produced by A. N. Palmer, a student of Gaskell, who developed the Palmer Method, as reflected in his Palmer's Guide to Business Writing, published in 1894. Also popular was Zaner-Bloser Method, introduced by Charles Paxton Zaner (15 February 1864 – 1 December 1918) and Elmer Ward Bloser (6 November 1865 – 1929) of the Zanerian Business College. The A. N. Palmer Company folded in the early 1980s.

Modern Styles include more than 200 published textbook curricula including: D'Nealian Method (a derivative of the Palmer Method which uses a slanted, serifed manuscript form followed by an entirely joined and looped cursive), Modern Zaner-Bloser which accounts for the majority of handwriting textbook sales in the US, A Beka, Schaffer, Peterson, Loops and Groups, McDougal, Steck Vaughn, and many others.

Italic Styles include Getty-Dubay Italic (slightly slanted), Eager, Portland, Barchowsky Fluent Handwriting, Queensland, etc.

Other copybook styles that are unique and do not fall into any previous categories are Smithhand, Handwriting without Tears, Ausgangsschrift, Bob Jones, etc. These may differ greatly from each other in a variety of ways. The first made video for correcting messy handwriting especially for people with ADHD and or dysgraphia was "Anyone Can Improve Their Own Handwriting" by learning specialist Jason Mark Alster MSc.

=== Schools in East Asia ===
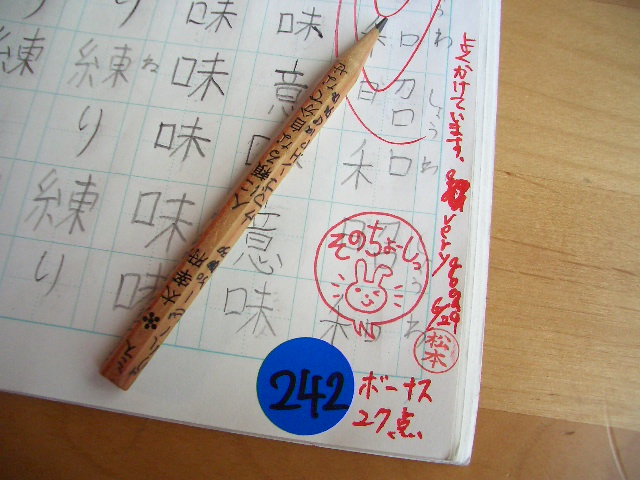
A typical Kanji practice notebook of a 3rd grader

By the nineteenth century, attention was increasingly given to developing quality penmanship in Eastern schools. Countries that had a writing system based on logographs and syllabaries placed particular emphasis on form and quality when learning. These countries, such as China and Japan, have pictophonetic characters that are difficult to learn. Chinese children start by learning the most fundamental characters first and building to the more esoteric ones. Often, children trace the different strokes in the air with the teacher and eventually start writing them on paper.

In the twentieth and twenty-first centuries, there have been more efforts to simplify these systems and standardize handwriting. For example, in China in 1955, in order to respond to illiteracy among people, the government introduced a Romanized version of Chinese script, called Pinyin. However, by the 1960s, people rebelled against the infringement upon traditional Chinese by foreign influences. This writing reform did not help illiteracy among peasants. Japanese also has simplified the Chinese characters it uses into scripts called kana. However kanji are still used in preference over kana in many contexts, and a large part of children's schooling is learning kanji. Moreover, Japan has tried to hold on to handwriting as an art form while not compromising the more modern emphasis on speed and efficiency. In the early 1940s, handwriting was taught twice, once as calligraphy in the art section of school curricula, and then again as a functional skill in the language section. The practical function of penmanship in Japan did not start to be questioned until the end of the twentieth century; while typewriters proved more efficient than penmanship in the modern West, these technologies had a hard time transferring to Japan, since the thousands of characters involved in the language made typing unfeasible.

== Motor control ==
Handwriting requires the motor coordination of multiple joints in the hand, wrist, elbow, and shoulder to form letters and to arrange them on the page. Holding the pen and guiding it across paper depends mostly upon sensory information from skin, joints and muscles of the hand and this adjusts movement to changes in the friction between pen and paper. With practice and familiarity, handwriting becomes highly automated using motor programs stored in motor memory. Compared to other complex motor skills handwriting is far less dependent on a moment-to-moment visual guidance.

Research in individuals with complete peripheral deafferentation with and without vision of their writing hand finds increase of number of pen touches, increase in number of inversions in velocity, decrease of mean stroke frequency and longer writing movement duration. The changes show that cutaneous and proprioceptive feedback play a critical role in updating the motor memories and internal models that underlie handwriting. In contrast, sight provides only a secondary role in adjusting motor commands.

== See also ==
- Typography – the appearance, arrangement, and style of printed text

Types of writing

- Handwriting, a person's particular style of writing by pen or a pencil
- Hand (handwriting), in paleography, refers to a distinct generic style of penmanship
- Block letters – also called printing, is the use of the simple letters children are taught to write when first learning
- Calligraphy – the art of writing itself, generally more concerned with aesthetics for decorative effect than normal handwriting.
- Cursive – any style of handwriting written in a flowing (cursive) manner, which connects many or all of the letters in a word, or the strokes in a CJK character or other grapheme.

Studies of writing and penmanship

- Chirography – handwriting, its style and character
- Diplomatics – forensic paleography (seeks the provenance of written documents).
- Graphonomics – is the interdisciplinary scientific study of the handwriting process and the handwritten product
- Palaeography – the study of script.

Penmanship-related professions

- Letterer – comic book lettering profession.
- Marriage certificates design or calligraphy
- Technical lettering – the process of forming letters, numerals, and other characters in technical drawing.
- Questioned document examiner – forensic science discipline which includes handwriting examination
- Penmanship instructor, at a Vocational school
- Wedding invitations design

Other penmanship-related topics

- Handwriting recognition – the ability of a computer to receive and interpret handwritten input
- Regional handwriting variation
- Signature
