= Slant (handwriting) =

Angle of downward strokes in handwriting

Slant is the predominant angle of the downward stroke in handwriting based on Latin script. The slant of a sample of writing is a feature of many regional handwriting variations, and also a reflection of the copybook that is taught.

== Examples ==
Copybook	Slant	When introduced	Region of origin
Handwriting without Tears	90	1976	United States
Carolingian	90	9th century	Europe
Humanistic Hand	90	15th century	Europe
Zaner-Bloser	?	1904	United States
D'Nealian	85	1978	United States
Getty-Dubay Italic	85	1976	United States
Palmer Method	85	1884	United States
BFH script	80	1997	United States
Copperplate	55	17th century	Europe
SmithHand	55	2000s	United States
Spanish Copybook	55	1650s	Central Spain
Spencerian	52	1840s	United States

- Slant is measured in degrees counterclockwise from the base line;
- A slant of less than 90 degrees is a right-hand slant;
- A slant of more than 90 degrees is a left-hand slant. (No examples in the above table.)

== Measurement of slants ==
A good basis for its estimation is the point of the handwritten curve where the velocity has its peak value in the downward stroke. The polar distribution of the running angle along a handwritten trajectory is another good method for estimating the slant angle. Left-handed writing is often accompanied by a slant value which is larger than 90 degrees, i.e., it is bent backward, to the left.

== Graphology ==
In graphology slant can refer to either upstroke or downstroke values. These strokes can be made in the upper, middle, lower, or any combination of those zones.

== Handwriting recognition ==
In handwriting recognition, an affine transformation can be used to normalize handwritten input towards a population average or towards 90 degrees.

== See also ==
- Graphonomics
- Shear mapping
