= Michael Sull =

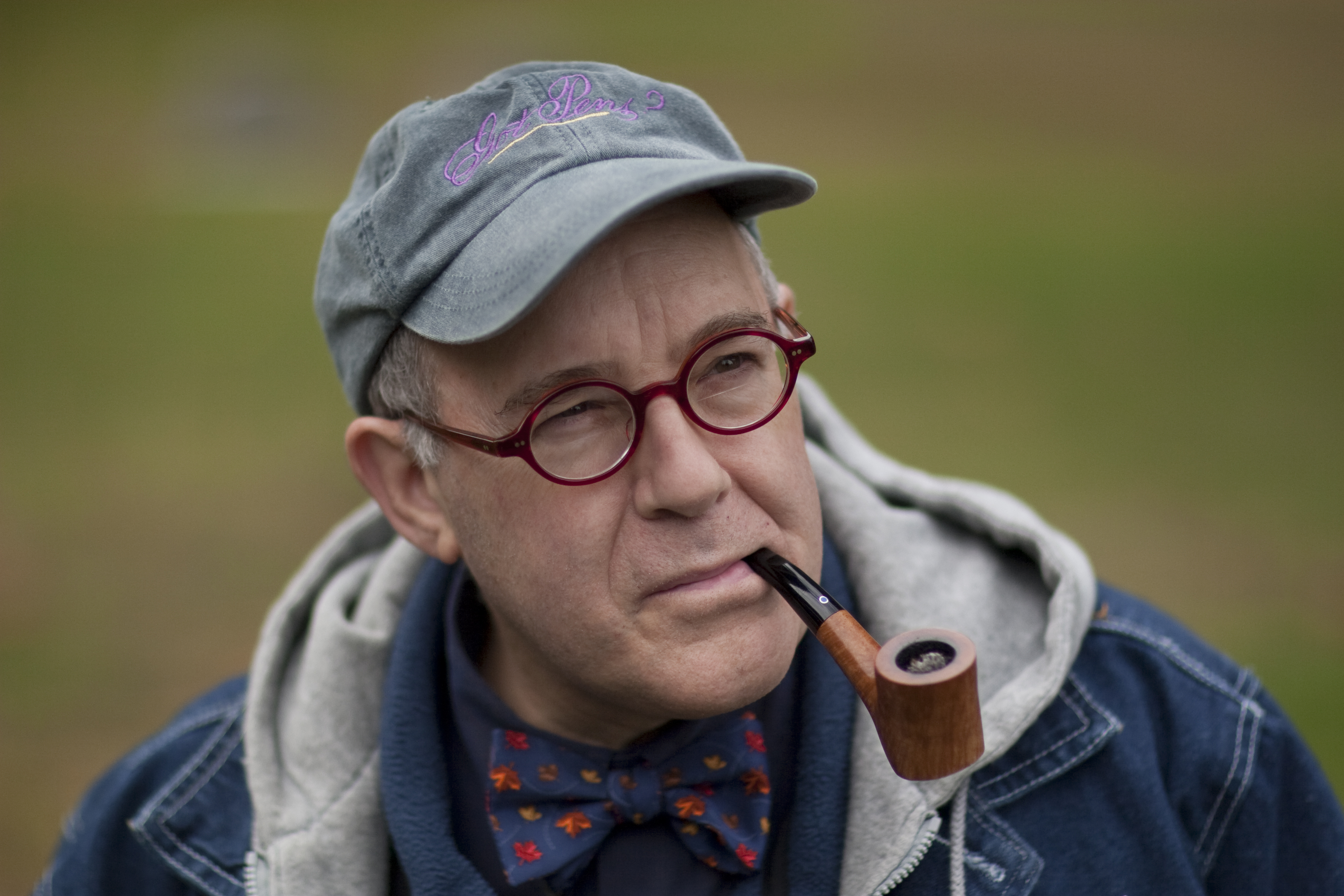
- Michael Sull in 2009
- Born: February 25, 1949 (age 77); Buffalo, New York
- Occupation: Calligrapher

Michael Sull (February 25, 1949) is an IAMPETH master penman and author living in Gardner, Kansas, United States. An expert on penmanship, he was Ronald Reagan's calligrapher after his presidency and is known worldwide for his skill and teaching ability. He regularly teaches handwriting, calligraphy, and engrossing programs throughout the United States, Europe and Asia.

Sull is considered one of America's foremost living Spencerian penmen. He has taught American penmanship in over twenty countries and publishes various educational materials focusing on calligraphy and penmanship. He also manufactures period style oblique dip penholders and pen blocks for use by penmen today.His penmanship is in the permanent collection of the World Calligraphy Museum in Moscow, Russia.

In Geneva, Ohio (the hometown Platt Rogers Spencer, inventor of Spencerian script) Sull previously organized annual week-long seminars dedicated to Spencerian script known as the Spencerian Saga from 1987 to 2012 wholly devoted to Spencerian Script and Ornamental Penmanship. Widely known for his penmanship skills and teaching abilities, he is the founder of The Spencerian Monument of American Handwriting in Geneva, Ohio.

After graduating from Syracuse University with a degree in forestry, he enlisted in the U.S. Navy in 1973 and was awarded the American Spirit Honor Medal. Sull's penmanship has lent itself to a lengthy career in the field, enabling him to found the Tidewater Calligraphy Guild in Virginia, work as a calligrapher and lettering artist at Hallmark Cards, and start his own ornamental penmanship company.

Today, Sull serves as Master Penman for the company Zaner-Bloser, serving as a historic consultant and performing public demonstrations. He currently resides with his wife, Debra, in Gardner, Kansas.

== Written works ==
- Spencerian Script and Ornamental Penmanship
- Learning to Write Spencerian Script
- Sull’s Manual of Advanced Penmanship
- The Art of Cursive Penmanship
- Sull’s Spencerian Practice Set
- Poems Of A Penman
- American Cursive Handwriting
