= Barchowsky Fluent Handwriting =

Modern teaching script

Barchowsky Fluent Handwriting (BFH) is a modern teaching script for handwriting based on Latin script, developed in the late 20th century by Nan Jay Barchowsky in Maryland, US, with the aim of allowing learners to make an easier transition from print writing to cursive.

== Characteristics ==
BFH is an italic script, similar to the Getty-Dubay Italic, where the letterforms of the print writing version taught to initial learners are very similar to the semi-connected cursive forms taught to intermediate learners.

BFH is written with a slant of 80 degrees, measured counterclockwise from the baseline.

== See also ==
- Spencerian script, a US teaching script
- Palmer script, a US teaching script
- D'Nealian script, a US teaching script
- Zaner-Bloser script, a US teaching script
- Getty-Dubay Italic script, a US teaching script
- Regional handwriting variation
