= Penmanship (disambiguation) =

Penmanship is the art or skill of writing with the hand and a writing instrument.

Penmanship may also refer to:

- Calligraphy, the art of fancy lettering, the art of giving form to signs in an expressive, harmonious and skillful manner
- Handwriting, a person's particular style of writing by pen or a pencil
- Hand (handwriting), a distinct style of calligraphy in palaeography
- Thomas Penmanship, ring name of professional wrestler Tommasso Whitney
