= BFH =

BFH may refer to:

- Bacacheri Airport, an airport in Brazil with the International Air Transport Association code BFH
- Bahrain Financial Harbour, a business complex in Bahrain
- Barchowsky Fluent Handwriting (also known as BFH script), a teaching script for handwriting
- Bern University of Applied Sciences (German: Berner Fachhochschule), a vocational university in Switzerland
- Federal Fiscal Court (German: Bundesfinanzhof), a German federal court of appeals for cases under fiscal jurisdiction
