= Zaner-Bloser =

Zaner-Bloser may refer to:

- Zaner-Bloser (company), an American publisher of handwriting and literacy instruction materials
- Zaner-Bloser (teaching script), an American teaching script popularized by the Zaner-Bloser company
