= International Association of Master Penmen, Engrossers and Teachers of Handwriting =

- IAMPETH official logo
- Abbreviation: IAMPETH
- Formation: January 1, 1949
- Legal status: 501(c)3 Non-profit organization
- Purpose: Educational
- Region served: Worldwide
- Members: over 1000 members
- President: Marie Hornback
- Main organ: Executive Board
- Website: http://www.iampeth.com/

The International Association of Master Penmen, Engrossers and Teachers of Handwriting (IAMPETH; eye-AM-peth) is an international association for practicing and preserving the arts of calligraphy, engrossing and penmanship founded in 1949.

IAMPETH maintains an archive of works of past masters (viewable, in person, only to members during the Annual Conference) in addition to online instruction guides on lettering styles such as copperplate, Spencerian script, illuminated manuscript production (engrossing) and others. A portion of the organization's collection has been digitally preserved and is available on their Internet Archive profile. An annual conference is held each year during the months of July or August in a US city. The convention consists of various classes, banquets, and demonstrations.

In 2017 IAMPETH introduced a new Certificate Program, replacing the Master Penman Program which was discontinued in 2015. This program allows all members who have been with the organization for three or more years to submit work to be considered for Certificate of Proficiency, Certificate of Excellence, and finally a Master Penman's Certificate. Current application requirements and associated costs are viewable by members only.

IAMPETH is composed of members from various countries. Dues range from $25 to $55 USD. Membership occasionally closes, temporarily, prior to the Annual Conference.

== IAMPETH Goals ==
- Practice and teach the arts of calligraphy, engrossing and fine penmanship
- Restore the teaching of penmanship in schools
- Improve the handwriting of young people
- Preserve and share with others the rich tradition of American Penmanship.
- Practice makes progress

== See also ==
- Penmanship
- Cursive
- Calligraphy
- Illuminated manuscript
