= Platt Rogers Spencer =

American calligrapher

- Born: November 7, 1800; East Fishkill, New York, United States
- Died: May 16, 1864 (aged 63); Geneva, Ohio, United States
- Known for: Originator of Spencerian penmanship
- Spouse: Persis Duty Spencer
- Children: 6
- Relatives: Adelia Cleopatra Graves, niece

Signature
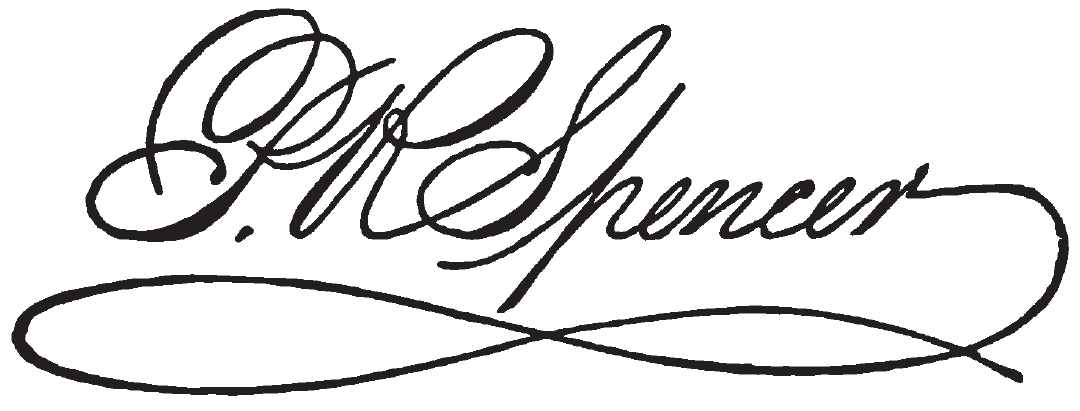

Platt Rogers Spencer (November 7, 1800 – May 16, 1864) was the originator of Spencerian penmanship, a popular system of cursive handwriting. He was a teacher and active in the business school movement.

== Early life ==
Spencer was born in East Fishkill, New York, on November 7, 1800. His father, Caleb, died in 1806, and the family moved to Jefferson, Ohio, in 1810. At the time, it was an unsettled area. Spencer became passionately fond of writing. Because paper was difficult to obtain at the time, Spencer wrote on birch tree bark, sand, ice, snow, the fly-leaves of his mother's Bible and, by permission of a cobbler, the leather in his shop.

== Career ==
In 1815, he taught his first writing class and, from 1816 to 1821, he was a clerk and a book keeper and, from 1821 to 1824, he studied in law, Latin, English literature and penmanship, taught in a common school and wrote up merchants' books. In 1824, he contemplated entering college with a view to preparing for the ministry, but, due to his alcoholism (aggravated by the prevalent drinking customs), he did not.

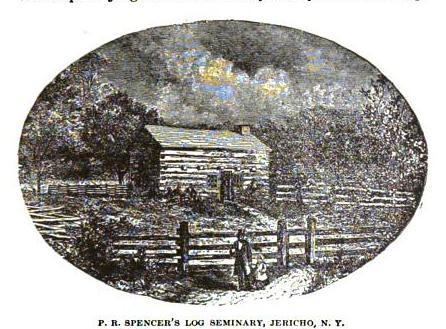
Spencer Log Seminary in Jericho, New York

Spencer taught in New York, where he founded the Spencer Seminary in Jericho, housed in a log cabin. He also taught in Ohio, where in 1832, he was able to withdraw from alcohol, becoming a total abstainer. He advocated abstaining from alcohol for the remainder of his life. Soon after his reformation, he was elected to public office, and was county treasurer for twelve years. He was instrumental in collecting the early history of Ashtabula County, and was deeply interested in American history. He engaged actively in anti-slavery movements and was an advocate of universal liberty. He died in 1864.

Spencer was instrumental in founding and promoting American business colleges, where he combined teaching and work on the development of his system of penmanship. Bryant & Stratton Colleges were founded in over 50 cities in the United States by students of Spencer, and Spencer was involved with the institution. In the winter of 1863, Spencer delivered his final lecture before the business college in Brooklyn, New York, and gave his last course of lessons in the business college in New York City. Spencer opened schools in Geneva and Cleveland, Ohio; and in Pittsburgh, Pennsylvania.

== Publications ==
His first publication on penmanship, prepared in collaboration with Victor M. Rice, was issued in 1848 under the title Spencer and Rice's System of Business and Ladies' Penmanship. This work was later published under the title Spencerian or Semi-Angular Penmanship. Additional publications on penmanship appeared from 1855 to 1863. The Spencerian Key to Practical Penmanship and New Spencerian Compendium were issued posthumously by his heirs.

== Honors ==
The Platt Rogers Spencer Papers are located at the Newberry Library in Chicago. The Spencer Archival Room of the Geneva Branch of the Ashtabula County District Library System contains biographical materials on the Spencer family.

In 1937, The East Geneva Rural School in Geneva changed its name to Platt R. Spencer School.

On August 24, 2012, the city of Geneva, Ohio, unveiled the Spencerian Monument at the re-dedication ceremony for the Ashtabula County Western Area Courthouse.

== See also ==
- Copperplate script
- Round hand
- Spencerian Script
