= Regional language =

Language spoken in parts but not all of a country

A regional language is a language spoken in a region of a sovereign state, whether it be a small area, a federated state or province or some wider area.

Internationally, for the purposes of the European Charter for Regional or Minority Languages, "regional or minority languages" means languages that are:

1. traditionally used within a given territory of a State by nationals of that State who form a group numerically smaller than the rest of the State's population and
2. different from the official language(s) of that State

Recognition of regional or minority languages must not be confused with recognition as an official language.

== Relationship with official languages ==
In some cases, a regional language may be closely related to the state's main language or official language. For example:

- The Frisian languages spoken in the Netherlands and Germany, which belong to the Germanic family.
- The Gutnish language, a regional language spoken in Gotland and related to the Swedish language.
- Kurdish in Kurdistan, which is an autonomous region in northern Iraq, Northwestern Iran and southeastern Turkey.
- Assyrian Neo-Aramaic in northern Iraq, northeastern Syria, southeastern Turkey and northwestern Iran.
- The several hundred Sinitic languages are nearly always replaced by Standard Chinese (based on the Beijing dialect) in writing.
  - Wu, in Shanghai, southern Jiangsu, Zhejiang and eastern Jiangxi.
  - Yue Chinese, in Guangdong, parts of Guangxi, Hainan, Hong Kong and Macau, Cantonese is the regional standard variety for Yue-speaking areas
  - Hakka, in parts of Guangdong, Jiangxi, Fujian, and Taiwan
  - Min, in Fujian, Taiwan, eastern Guangdong and Hainan.
  - Xiang, in Hunan.
  - Gan, in Jiangxi.
- Kashubian, a regional language of Poland, has a bit under 90 thousand speakers, and is a language of the Lechitic branch, alongside Polish and Silesian.
- Limburgish, a regional language in Germany, the Netherlands and Belgium, has around one million speakers and is closely related to Luxembourgish, Kleverlandish and Ripuarian.
- Low German (also referred to as Low Saxon), an officially recognized regional language in Germany and the Netherlands, the direct descendant of Old Saxon. Sometimes (e.g. by nds and nds-nl Wikipedia) considered two languages divided by today’s Netherlands–German border on account of Dutch influences in the west and German influences in the east; closely related to Frisian, more distantly to German.
- Scots, a regional language of Scotland and Northern Ireland (both part of the United Kingdom, and where it is known as Ulster Scots in the latter location), belongs to the same family of West Germanic languages as English.
- Neapolitan, Sicilian and Venetian, regional languages spoken in Italy which also belong to the same family of standard Italian (Italo-Dalmatian).
- Regional languages of Spain and Portugal:
  - Aranese, Catalan, and Galician are each, in the regions where they are the autochthonous language, co-official in status with Castilian (Spanish) which is official everywhere in the Kingdom of Spain. Catalan is an Occitano-Romance language.
  - Asturian and Leonese are recognized (but unofficial) in Asturias and Castile and León (Spain), while Mirandese is co-official with Portuguese in Miranda do Douro (Portugal). These Romance languages are classified under the term Astur-Leonese languages. Astur-Leonese is closely related to both Castilian and Galician, which itself is most closely related to Portuguese.
  - Occitan, most widely spoken across the Pyrenees in France and Catalonia, together with Catalan, forms a subgroup of Romance languages linguistically intermediate between French and the Ibero-Romance languages of Spain and Portugal. Aranese is a subdialect of Gascon
- Tibetic languages
  - Amdo tibetan language have regional official status in Amdo or Qinghai.
  - Standard Tibetan is currently based on Lhasa Tibetan.
- Võro and Seto, regional languages of Estonia, are either dialects of Estonian or separate Finnic languages as Estonian.
- Walloon, a regional language of France and Belgium, belongs to the same family of Oïl languages as French.
- Hindi and English are the official languages of India's Central Government.
  - The officially declared regional languages of India are: Assamese, Bengali, Bodo, Dogri, Gujarati, Hindi, Kannada, Kashmiri, Konkani, Maithili, Malayalam, Manipuri, Marathi, Nepali, Odia, Punjabi, Sanskrit, Santali, Sindhi, Tamil, Telugu, and Urdu. Most are Indo-Aryan languages like Hindi and descend from Sanskrit, but 4 (Telugu, Tamil, Kannada, Malayalam) are Dravidian languages, 2 (Bodo and Manipuri) are Sino-Tibetan, and Santali is a Munda language. In addition, there have been demands for 38 more languages to receive recognition.
- Sylheti, a regional language of the Sylhet Division of Bangladesh and the Barak Valley of Assam, India, is often considered a dialect of Bengali but is also sometimes seen as a separate language.
- Chittagonian, a regional language of parts of the Chittagong Division of Bangladesh, is often considered a dialect of Bengali but is also sometimes seen as a separate language.

In other cases, a regional language may be very different from the state's main language or official language. For example:

- Basque, a regional language spoken in Spain and France (Basque Country).
- Breton, a regional Celtic language spoken in France (Brittany).
- Cherokee is an Iroquoian language, and one of the many Native American languages spoken in the U.S. State of Oklahoma.
- Cornish, a regional Celtic language in the United Kingdom (Cornwall).
- Corsican, a regional language in France (Corsica) closely related to Tuscan-derived Italian.
- Gagauz, a regional Turkic language spoken in Moldova.
- Livonian, a regional language of the Finnic family spoken in Latvia.
- Resian, a dialect of Slovene spoken in Italy (Resia valley).
- Sardinian, a regional Romance language spoken in Italy (Sardinia).
- Scottish Gaelic, a regional Celtic language spoken in the United Kingdom (Scotland).
- Sorbian, a regional Slavic language of Germany.
- Welsh, a regional Celtic language spoken in the United Kingdom (Wales).

== Official languages as regional languages ==
An official language of a country may also be spoken as a regional language in a region of a neighbouring country. For example:

- Afrikaans, an official language of South Africa, is a regional language of Namibia.
- Arabic, official in Zanzibar, a region of Tanzania.
- Bengali is the official language of Bangladesh, and is the regional language of West Bengal in India.
- Bulgarian is the official language of Bulgaria, and is the regional language of Albania, Czech Republic, Hungary, Moldova, Romania, Serbia, Turkey, and Ukraine.
- Cantonese, one of the official standard varieties in Hong Kong and Macau (both special administrative regions of the People's Republic of China), is used as a regional language of the province of Guangdong, People's Republic of China.
- Catalan, the official language of Andorra, is a regional language in Spain (Catalonia, Balearic Islands and Valencian Community), France (Pyrénées Orientales) and Italy (Alghero, Sardinia).
- German, an official language of Austria, Belgium, Germany, Liechtenstein, Luxembourg and Switzerland, is a regional language in Italy (South Tyrol), Poland (Silesia), France (Alsace and Lorraine), Denmark (Southern), Namibia, Argentina, Brazil, Chile, and Venezuela.
- Hakka, one of the national languages of Taiwan, is spoken as a regional language in the provinces of Guangdong, Jiangxi and Fujian, People's Republic of China.
- Hokkien, one of the national languages of Taiwan, is spoken as a regional language in the provinces of Fujian, Zhejiang and Guangdong, People’s Republic of China.
- Hungarian, a Uralic language and official in Hungary, is a regional language of Romania (Northern Transylvania).
- Irish, the first official language of the Republic of Ireland, is a regional language in Northern Ireland, part of the United Kingdom.
- Japanese, one of the national language in Japan, is a regional language in Palau (Angaur Island).
- Korean, the official language of Korea, is a regional language in People's Republic of China (Yanbian Korean Autonomous Prefecture).
- Malay, the official language of Malaysia, Brunei and Singapore, is a regional language in Indonesia (Riau Province).
- Portuguese, the official language of Angola, Brazil, Cape Verde, East Timor, Mozambique, Portugal, and São Tomé and Príncipe, is a regional language in South Africa and Uruguay and in Goa in India and Olivenza in Spain; it is also both the official and regional language in Macau.
- Romanian, the official language of Romania, Moldova, Transnistria, Serbia (Vojvodina), is a regional language in Bulgaria, Hungary (Gyula), Serbia [Timok Valley (both known as Romanian and "Vlach")], Ukraine (Chernivtsi and Odesa oblasts)
- Russian, the official language of the Russian Federation and Belarus, is a regional language of Abkhazia, South Ossetia and other entities.
- Tamil, one of the official languages of Singapore and Sri Lanka, is a regional language in India (Tamil Nadu)
- Tigrinya, an official language of Eritrea, is a regional language in Ethiopia (Tigray Region).
- Turkish, the official language of Turkey, Cyprus and Northern Cyprus, is a regional language of Kosovo, North Macedonia and Iraq.

== See also ==
- British–Irish Council
- Languages of France
- Languages of Italy
- Languages of Spain
- Languages of the European Union
- Languages of the United Kingdom
- Minority language
- National language
- Regional handwriting variation
- Yorkshire Dialect
