= Segment (handwriting) =

Piece of the pen-tip trajectory in handwriting

A segment of handwriting is a piece of the pen-tip trajectory between two defined segmentation points. If the occurrence of a minimum in the absolute (tangential) velocity is used as a heuristic for segmentation, the pen-tip trajectory can be subdivided into segments corresponding to ballistic strokes.

In handwriting recognition or optical character recognition, other terminologies may be used, such as the term glyph for a non-character (i.e.: sub character or multi-character) pattern.
