= D'Nealian =

Teaching script for handwriting

D'Nealian cursive writing

The D'Nealian Method (sometimes misspelled Denealian) is a style of writing and teaching handwriting script based on Latin script which was developed between 1965 and 1978 by Donald N. Thurber (1927–2020) in Michigan, United States. Building on his experience as a primary school teacher, Thurber aimed to make the transition from print writing to cursive easier for learners.

== History ==
Donald Neal Thurber (December 15, 1927 in Detroit, Michigan – January 6, 2020 in Monroe, Michigan) received a bachelor's degree from the University of Toledo and a master's degree from Eastern Michigan University. He began teaching elementary pupils in Luna Pier in 1953. While teaching first grade in 1961, Thurber examined what he regarded as the illogic of handwriting education in the United States. From 1965, he developed the D'Nealian Method as an alternative to teaching scripts then available. The name of the D'Nealian Method comes from Thurber's first name contracted with his middle name ("Neal"). Thurber's system of writing was first publicly introduced in the United States in 1978. Thurber eventually retired in 1984 as principal of Chapman Elementary School.

== Description ==
The D'Nealian Method of handwriting is derived from the Palmer Method with an alphabet comprising two different sets of letters – one for print writing (sometimes also called "manuscript printing"), and one for cursive writing. Thirteen letters change shape between print and cursive, while the slant of 85 degrees, measured counterclockwise from the base line, does not change at all.

Thurber designed the D'Nealian Method to alleviate the problems with teaching children the traditional script method and the subsequent difficulty transitioning to cursive writing.

D'Nealian print writing, exemplified in the School Oblique typeface

When learning the D'Nealian Method of handwriting, students are first taught a form of print writing devised by Thurber. The letters of D'Nealian print writing have many similarities with the cursive version. In the second step, so-called "monkey tails" are added to the print writing, which in the third step are joined together to form the D'Nealian cursive script.

== Prevalence ==
When the D'Nealian Method was introduced in 1978, it quickly became popular and led to a significant decline in the use of the previously leading Zaner–Bloser Method. In theory, it is easier for children to learn and acquire basic handwriting skills using D'Nealian than traditional cursive methods.

It has been claimed that close to 90% of US schoolchildren who follow the traditional print-then-cursive route to handwriting are taught either the Zaner–Bloser or the D'Nealian alphabet.

== Criticism ==
A key issue with Thurber's system is the manner of letter formation. The addition of so-called "monkey tails" to print writing as learners progress to cursive writing effectively adds a further step to the teaching and learning path. While some find such an additional step beneficial for a smooth transition from print writing to cursive, others view it as unnecessarily complicating how children are taught to write.

Another common issue is that D'Nealian is taught extremely early, to first and second grade students, many of whom are still learning the rudiments of print writing. At times, some school districts have abruptly changed their teaching of handwriting, possibly causing difficulties for students who must then adapt to a different style.

A 1993 research review by Steve Graham concludes that "there is no credible evidence" that D'Nealian makes a difference in children's handwriting. He also states that D'Nealian creates practical problems for teachers (who must themselves learn the system and defend it to parents) and that it requires many young children to unlearn writing forms that they have already developed before formal instruction.

== See also ==
- Regional handwriting variation

US teaching scripts

- Spencerian script
- Palmer script
- Zaner–Bloser script
- Getty-Dubay Italic script
- BFH script
