= Copperplate script =

Style of calligraphic writing

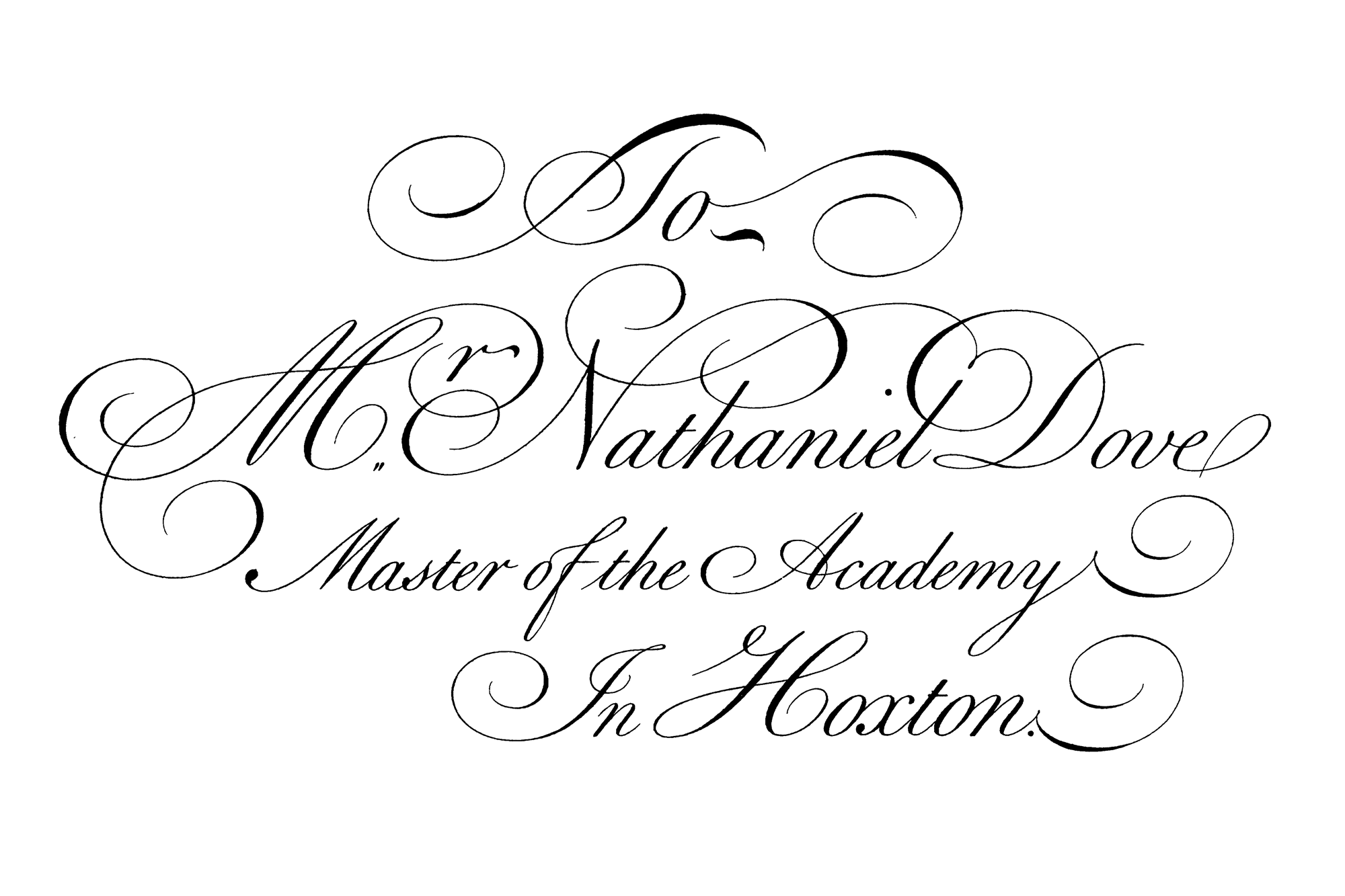
A sample of a copperplate engraving on page 194 of The Universal Penman, first published c. 1740 – c. 1741. An example of George Bickham's English Roundhand lettering and engraving ability.

Copperplate script is a roundhand script based on English Roundhand. Although often used as an umbrella term for various forms of pointed-pen calligraphy, copperplate most accurately refers to script styles represented in copybooks created using engraved copper plates.

Earlier versions of this script required a broad-edged quill pen. Later, with the rise of industrialization, the use of more flexible and durable fine-point metal nibs became widespread.

Many masters offered their contributions in defining the aesthetic canons of the copperplate script, but the work of the writing master and engraver George Bickham stood out as fundamental. In his book The Universal Penman (1733–1741), Bickham collected script samples from twenty-five of the most talented London writing masters.

Copperplate was undoubtedly the most widespread script in the period between the 17th and 18th centuries, and its influence spread not only throughout Europe but also to North America.

== See also ==
- D'Nealian, a style of writing and teaching cursive and manuscript adapted from the Palmer Method
- Engraving
- Palmer Method, a form of penmanship instruction developed in the late 19th century that replaced Spencerian script as the most popular handwriting system in the United States
- Round hand, a style of handwriting and calligraphy originating in England in the 1660s
- Zaner-Bloser, another streamlined form of Spencerian script
- Teaching script
