= A. N. Palmer =

American educational theorist (1860–1927)

Austin Norman Palmer (December 22, 1860 – November 16, 1927) was an American innovator in the field of penmanship whose development and widespread distribution of the Palmer Method of handwriting had a great influence on the handwriting of the American education systems. In the early 20th century, Palmer's method of handwriting came on the tail of nearly a half-century of ornamental writing and offered a more simplified, fast, legible, and economic form of writing for the youth and business people of the day.

As a young boy, Palmer worked his way through G. A. Gaskell's penmanship school as a janitor and chore boy. After completing his penmanship education he secured a role as a penmanship instructor in Samuel A. Goodyear's Business School at Cedar Rapids, Iowa. Palmer taught at Goodyear’s business school in Cedar Rapids and later acquired ownership of the school after Goodyear moved into publishing. This solidified a lifelong association between A. N. Palmer and the city of Cedar Rapids, Iowa.

Palmer's most influential textbook, The Palmer Method of Business Writing, was published in 1901.
