= Ballistic stroke =

Single handwriting mark

In handwriting research, the concept of stroke is used in various ways. In engineering and computer science, there is a tendency to use the term stroke for a single connected component of ink (in off-line handwriting recognition) or a complete pen-down trace (in on-line handwriting recognition). Thus, such stroke may be a complete character or a part of a character. However, in this definition, a complete word written as connected cursive script should also be called a stroke. This is in conflict with the suggested unitary nature of stroke as a relatively simple shape.

In the research field of handwriting motor control, the term ballistic stroke is used. It is defined as the trajectory segment between two consecutive minima in the absolute velocity of the pen tip. The time delay between the cortical brain command and a muscle contraction is so large that the 100 millisecond ballistic strokes need to be planned by the brain, as feedback by hand-eye coordination requires a much slower movement than is the case in the normal handwriting process.

== See also ==
- Graphonomics
