= Handwriting =

Writing created by a person with a writing implement

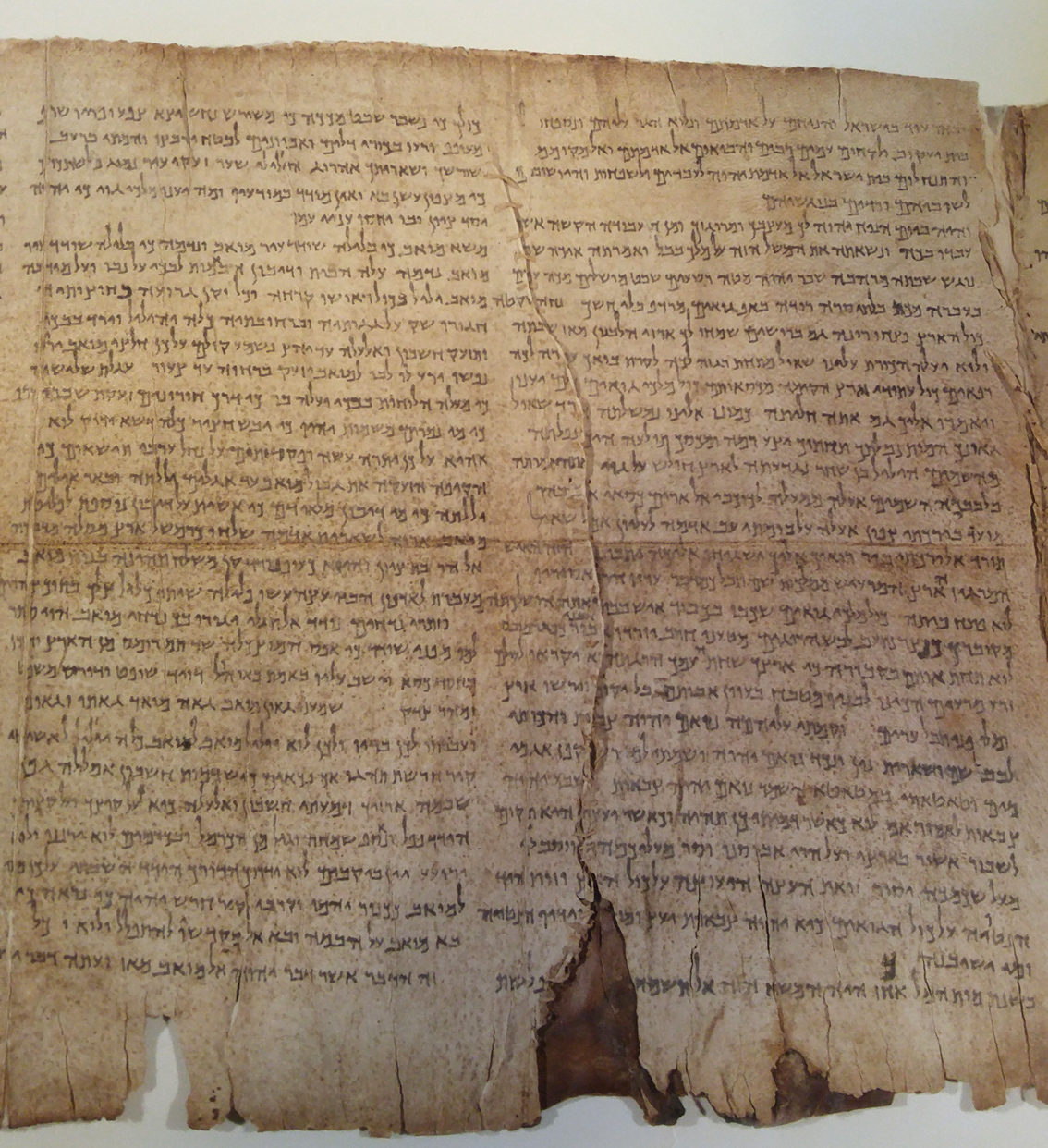
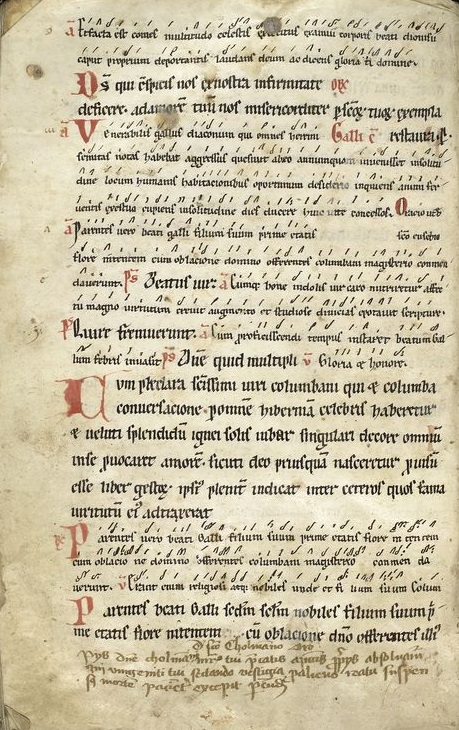
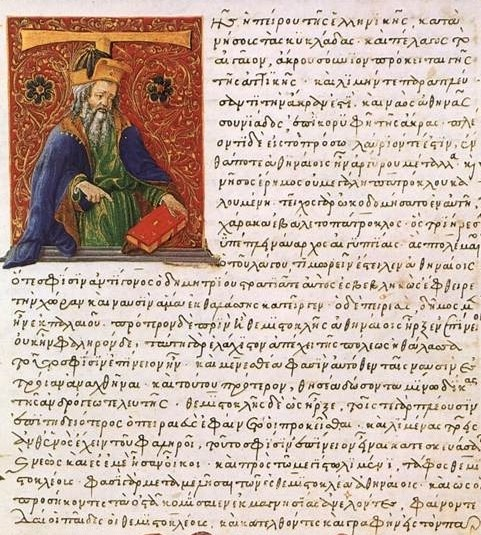
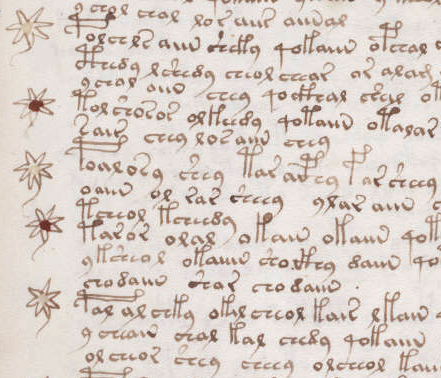
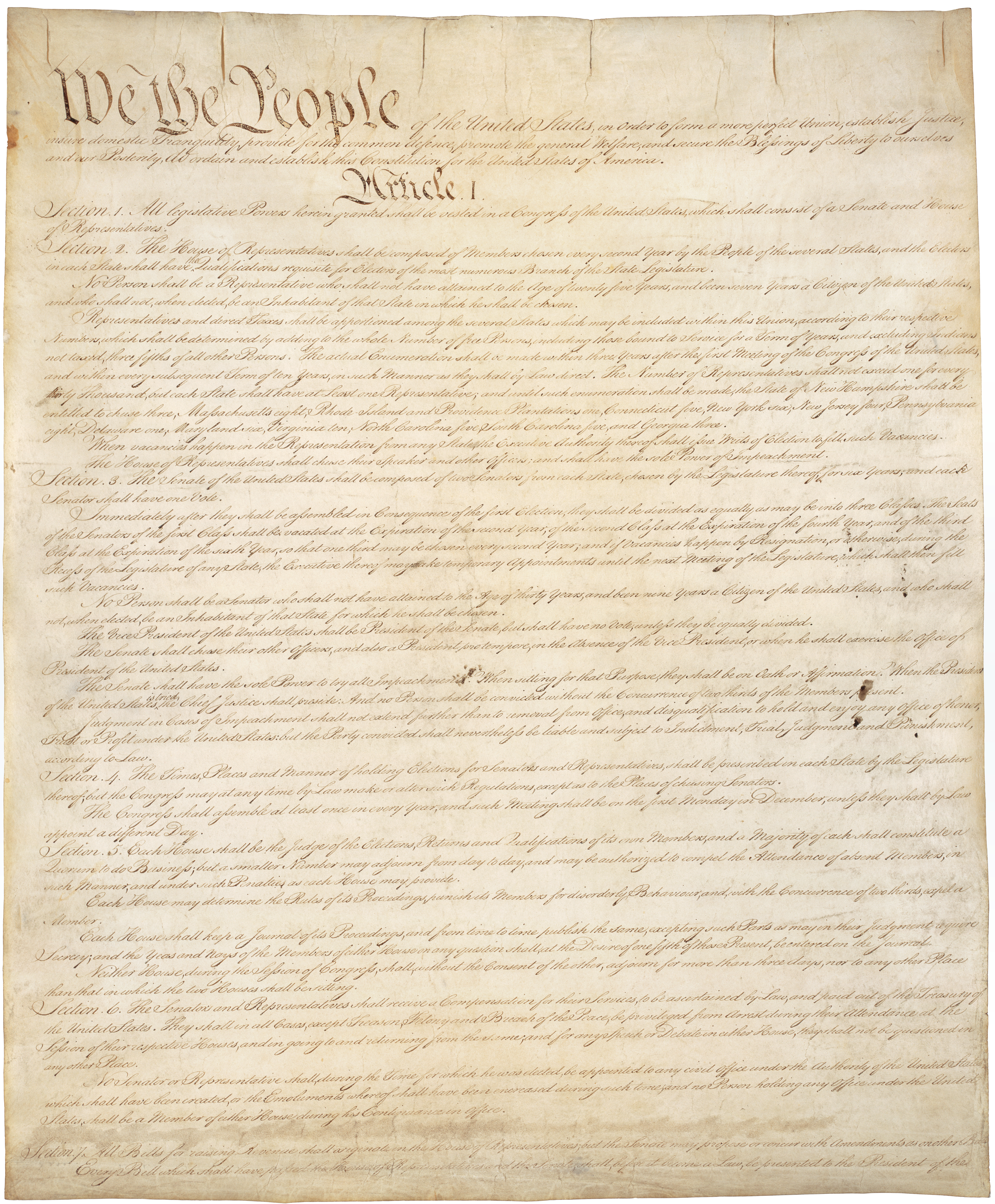
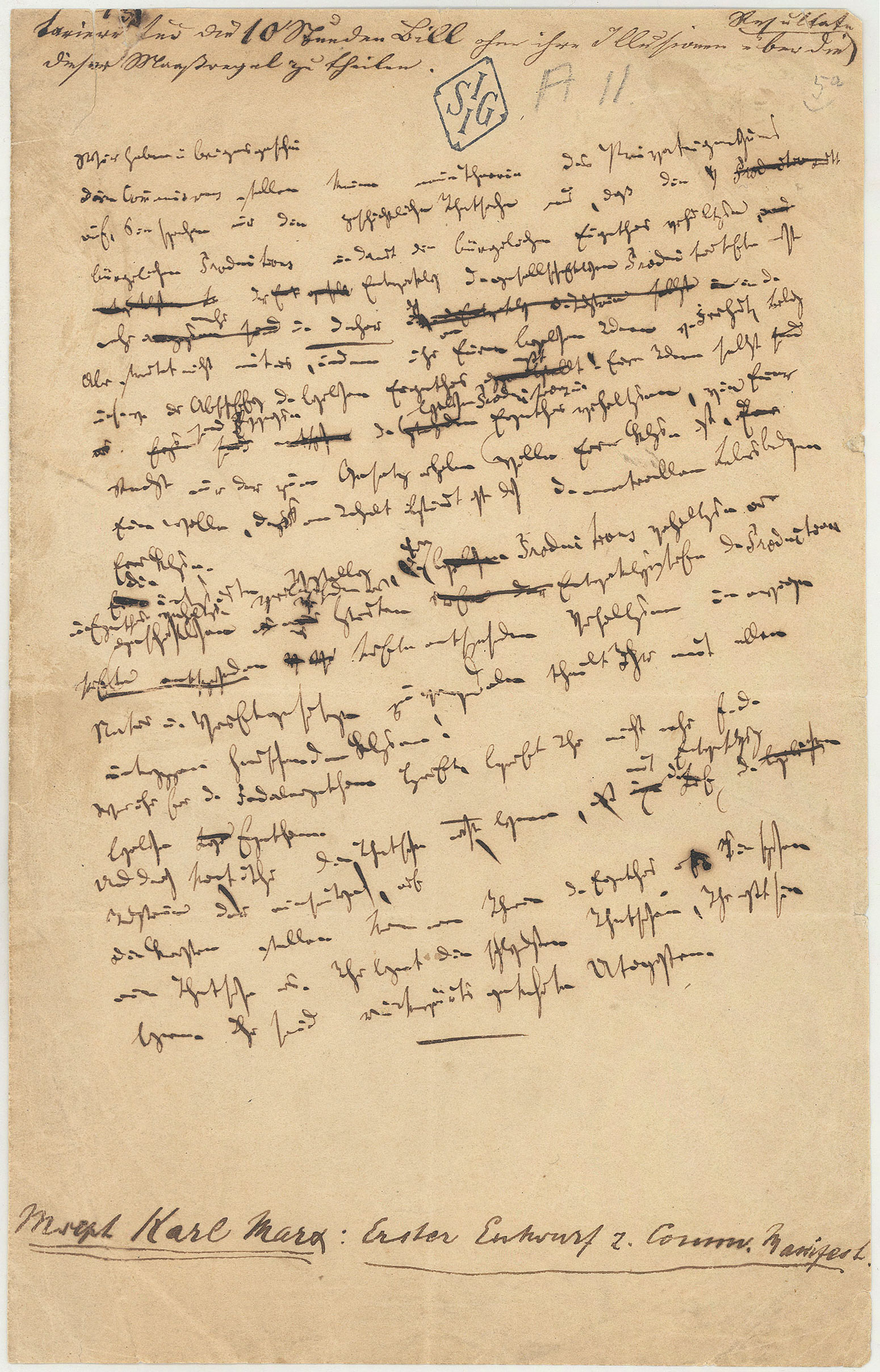
Various examples of different handwritings in different languages throughout history; clockwise from top left: Isaiah Scroll, a breviary, Voynich manuscript, The Communist Manifesto, Constitution of the United States, Description of Greece

Handwriting in Italian schools (20th–21st century)

Handwriting is the personal and unique style of writing with a writing instrument, such as a pen or pencil in the hand. Handwriting includes both block and cursive styles and is separate from generic and formal handwriting script/style, calligraphy or typeface. Because each person's handwriting is unique and different, it can be used to verify a document's writer. The deterioration of a person's handwriting is also a symptom or result of several different diseases. The inability to produce clear and coherent handwriting is also known as dysgraphia.

== Uniqueness ==
Each person has their own unique style of handwriting, whether it be everyday handwriting or their personal signature. Cultural environment and the characteristics of the written form of the first language that one learns to write are the primary influences on the development of one's own unique handwriting style. Even identical twins who share appearance and genetics do not have the same handwriting.

Characteristics of handwriting include:

- the specific shape of letters, e.g. their roundness or sharpness
- regular or irregular spacing between letters
- the slope of the letters
- the rhythmic repetition of the elements or arrhythmia
- the pressure to the paper
- the average size of letters
- the thickness of letters
- the spacing between letters, words and sentences

== Medical conditions ==
Developmental dysgraphia is very often accompanied by other learning and/or neurodevelopmental disorder like ADHD. Similarly, people with ADD/ADHD have higher rates of dyslexia. It is unknown how many individuals with ADD/ADHD who also struggle with penmanship actually have undiagnosed specific learning disabilities like developmental dyslexia or developmental dysgraphia causing their handwriting difficulties.

Children with ADHD have been found to be more likely to have less legible handwriting, make more spelling errors, more insertions and/or deletions of letters and more corrections. In children with these difficulties, the letters tend to be larger with wide variability of letters, letter spacing, word spacing, and the alignment of letters on the baseline. Variability of handwriting increases with longer texts. Fluency of the movement is normal but children with ADHD were more likely to make slower movements during the handwriting task and hold the pen longer in the air between movements, especially when they had to write complex letters, implying that planning the movement may take longer. Children who have ADHD were more likely to have difficulty parameterising movements in a consistent way. This has been explained with motor skill impairment either due to lack of attention or lack of inhibition. To anticipate a change of direction between strokes, constant visual attention is essential. With inattention, changes will occur too late, resulting in higher letters and poor alignment of letters on the baseline. The influence of medication on the quality of handwriting is not clear.

== Graphology ==
Graphology is the pseudoscientific study and analysis of handwriting in relation to human psychology. Graphology is primarily used as a recruiting tool in the applicant screening process for predicting personality traits and job performance, despite research showing consistently null correlations for these uses.

== Handwriting recognition ==
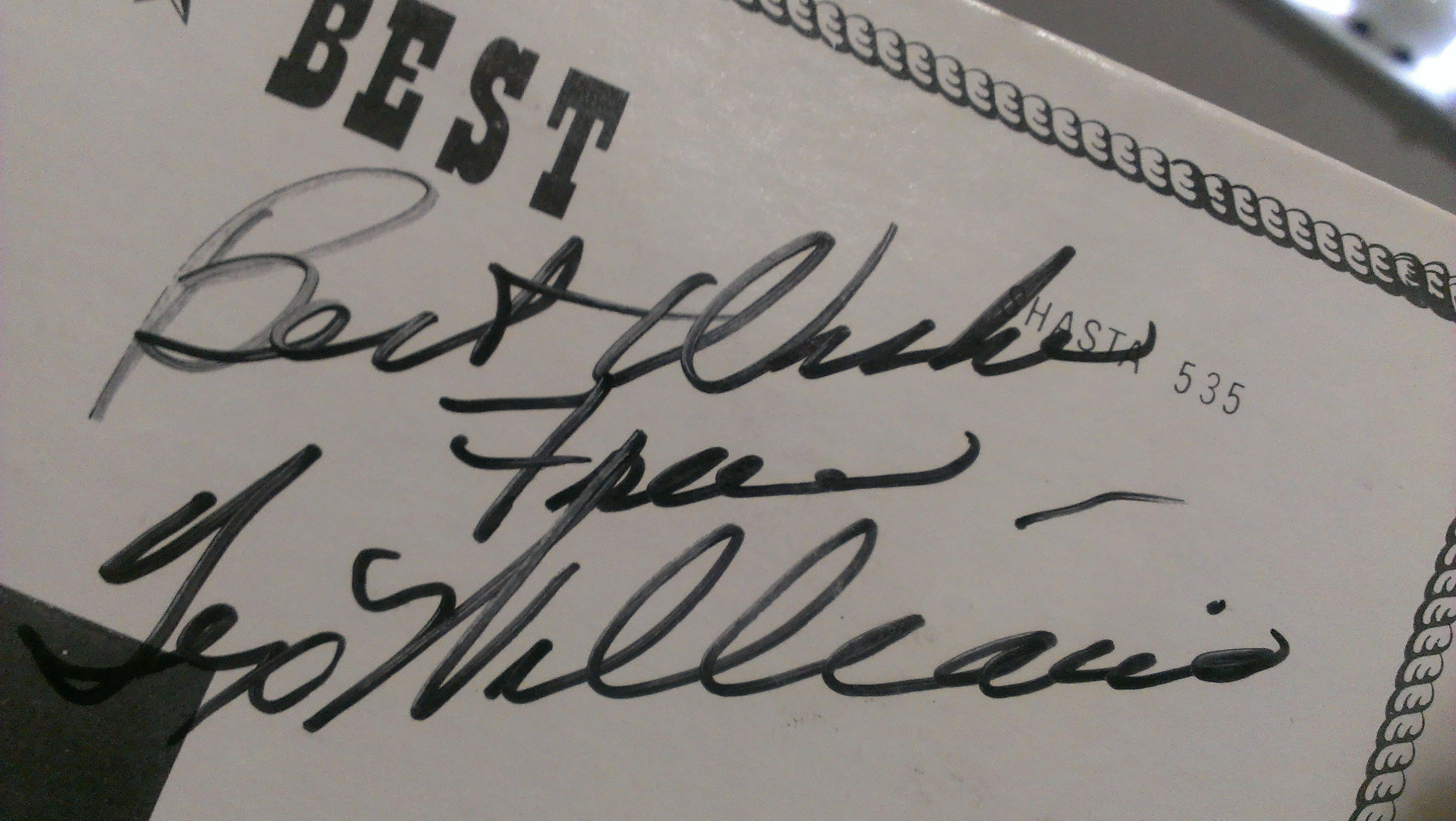
Signature of country star Tex Williams

Handwriting recognition (HWR), also known as handwritten text recognition (HTR), is the ability of a computer to receive and interpret intelligible handwritten input from sources such as paper documents, photographs, touch-screens and other devices. The image of the written text may be sensed "off line" from a piece of paper by optical scanning (optical character recognition) or intelligent word recognition. Alternatively, the movements of the pen tip may be sensed "on line", for example by a pen-based computer screen surface, a generally easier task as there are more clues available. A handwriting recognition system handles formatting, performs correct segmentation into characters, and finds the most possible words.

== Pedagogy ==
=== Significance in education ===
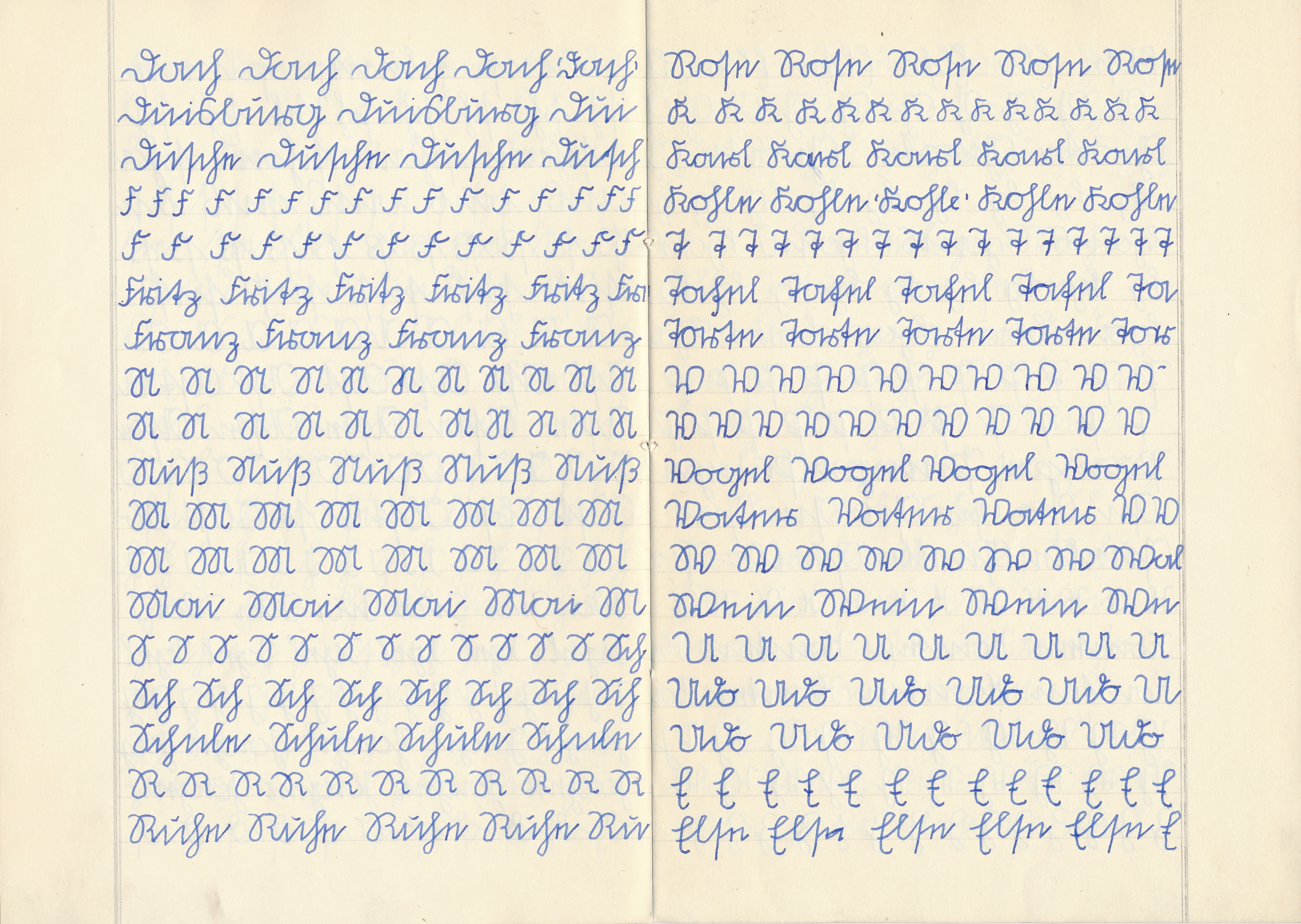
First exercises in German handwriting (Sütterlin) in a school notebook (1953)

As pen-and-paper assignments remain common throughout the century, handwriting practice exercises are still issued by instructors worldwide because handwriting is recognized as a primary tool for the communication of ideas. In order for handwriting to be efficiently utilized by students, it is ideal for the process to be familiar and automatic. The letter-writing skill can reflect the beginnings of orthographic knowledge well, and this knowledge has been shown to be important to spelling in older children. Better letter recognition can be facilitated by practicing handwriting in late preschool, as studies suggest that elementary students benefit from explicit handwriting instruction. With sufficient practice, legibility tends to improve over time.

Additionally, research indicates that handwriting production is more cognitively costly and challenging for children than oral language production. Poor handwriting skills and autonomy have been shown to often impair higher-level cognition and creative thinking in children, leading them to become labelled by their instructors as dysgraphic or clumsy. Meta-analysis of classroom assignments also found that the legibility of handwriting affects the grading of work as clearer handwriting tends to receive better marks than illegible or messier handwriting, the phenomenon of which has been coined "the presentation effect."

Also, it was found that movements through handwriting help children organize their perceptions and improve their ability to recognize letters by shaping their spatial understanding. In further study, because of the implied importance of handwriting to academic success, considerable research has been conducted into the efficacy of a variety of teaching methods. When quantifying writing fluency through parameters such as writing speed and duration of intermissions, teaching handwriting through digital tablets/technology, individualized instruction, and rote motor practice produced statistically significant increases in legibility and writing fluency which were able to be quantified.

Students with different levels of handwriting ability, including those with physical challenges, showed greater improvements in manuscript handwriting after receiving instruction through a computer-based system, compared to traditional methods.

=== Cognitive processes in writers ===
Children with specific learning disorders, such as poor/slow handwriting, have been observed in psychological study to follow specific mental frameworks which instructors can use to help pinpoint weakness in linguistic skill and develop their students' fluency and writing composition. The Hayes & Berninger framework is a stratified web of interconnected thought processes which relate different cognitive processes to each other in their function of writing in general, and this framework has seen considerable use in pedagological research. For example, underdevelopment of long-term memory, which is in the lower "resource level" of cognitive strata, can then be linked to underdeveloped motor planning for hand-writing individual letters, which bottleneck higher-order cognitive processes such as sentence structure and other critical thinking.

== Phenomenology ==
For a wide variety of writers, writing by hand has been described as a process which enhances expressivity and the discovery of individuality. The act of writing has been described as more "intimate", and the physical manipulation of a writing utensil on another physical medium, such as paper and pen, has been asserted to be more effective in conveying personal experiences and creating writing as art. In comparison to technological methods of printing writing, such as with a typewriter or a word processor, handwriting is said to be less impersonal and distancing by writers such as Pablo Neruda and William Barrett. Among many writers who agree with such viewpoints, the sensuality, touch, feel and materiality of handwriting seem to all contribute to a bodily experience which allegedly enhances creative writing.

== See also ==
- Asemic writing – Wordless open semantic form of writing
- Blackletter – Historic European script and typeface
- Block letters – Style of writing Latin script
- Cursive – Style of penmanship
- Handwriting movement analysis – Analysis of handwriting and drawing
- History of writing
- Literacy – Ability to read and write
- Manuscript – Document written by hand
- Palaeography – Study of handwriting and manuscripts
- Shakespeare's handwriting
- Signature – Mark made as a proof of identity and intent
- Handwriting script – Style of handwriting
  - Calligraphy – Writing as a visual art
  - Bastarda – Various scripts and typefaces of Renaissance Europe
  - Book hand – Stylised medieval handwriting style
  - Chancery hand – Two styles of historic handwriting
  - Court hand – Handwriting style in medieval English law courts
  - Italic script – Style of handwriting and calligraphy developed in Italy
  - Kurrent – Form of German-language handwriting German handwriting script
  - Penmanship – Technique of writing with the hand
  - Rotunda (script) – Medieval blackletter script
  - Round hand – Type of handwriting
  - Secretary hand – Style of European handwriting
  - Ronde script (calligraphy) – Sixteenth-century French script
