= Spencerian script =

American business handwriting style

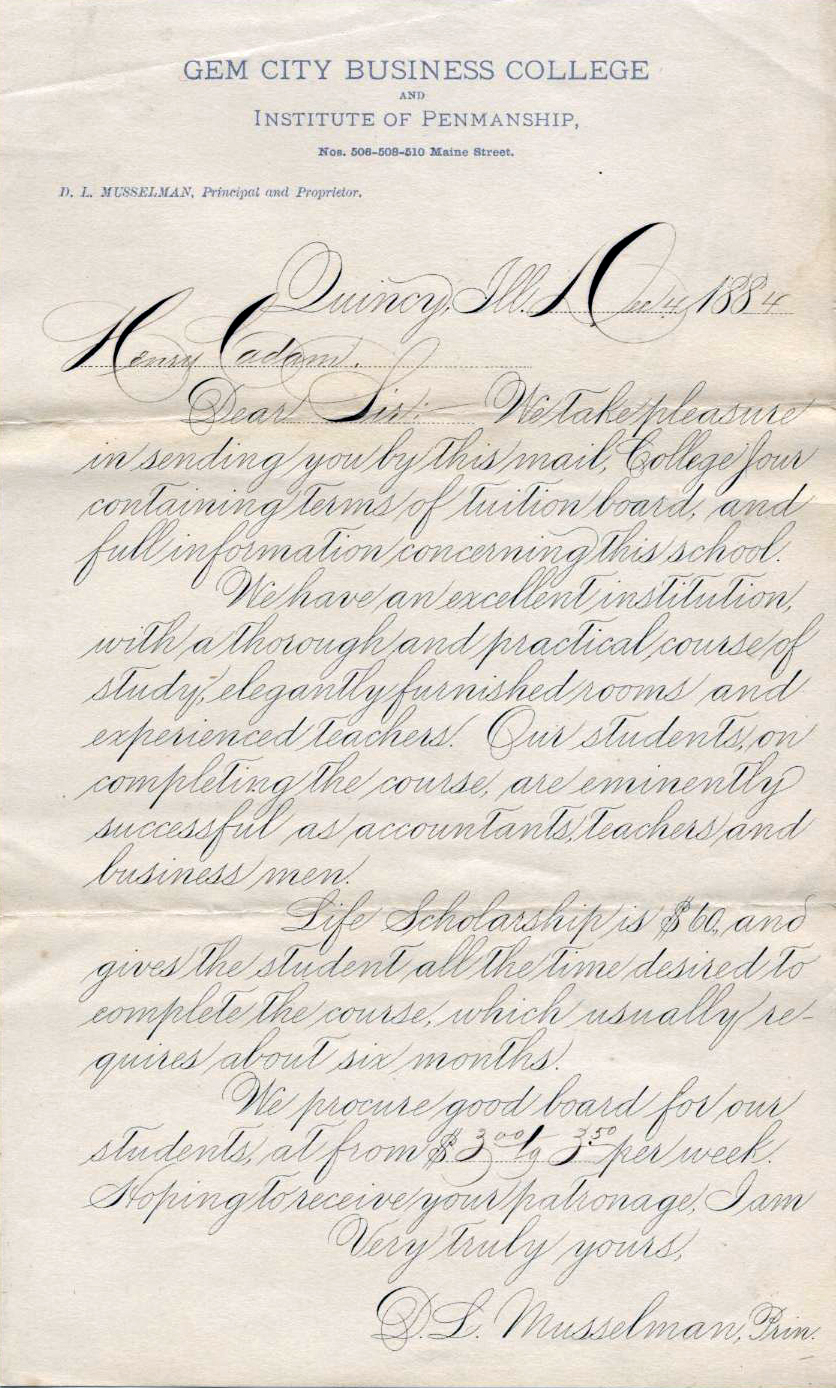
Enduring example, twenty years after Platt Rogers Spencer's death, of Spencerian script from 1884 from the president of Gem City Business College of Quincy, Illinois

Spencerian script is a handwriting script that was used in the United States from approximately 1850 to 1925, and was considered the de facto standard writing style for business correspondence in the United States prior to the widespread adoption of the typewriter. Spencerian script, a form of cursive handwriting, was also widely integrated into the school system as an instructional method until the "simpler" Palmer Method replaced it. President James A. Garfield called the Spencerian script "the pride of our country and the model of our schools."

== History ==
Platt Rogers Spencer, whose name the style bears, used various existing scripts and nature as inspiration to develop a unique oval-based penmanship style that could be written very quickly and legibly to aid in matters of business correspondence as well as elegant personal letter-writing. Spencer, inspired by the forms that he saw of smooth pebbles in a stream, aimed to create a graceful script to resemble those shapes. While likely originally writing and developing the script with a quill pen, Spencerian script's evolution is tied to the availability and development of higher-quality steel pens.

Spencerian script was developed in 1840 and began soon after to be taught in the school Spencer established specifically for that purpose, in doing so replacing a form of copperplate script, English roundhand, which was the most prominent script being taught in America. He quickly turned out graduates who left his school to start replicas of it abroad, and Spencerian script thus began to reach the common schools. Spencerian script even became the official hand of government clerks. Spencer never saw the great success that his penmanship style enjoyed because he died in 1864, but his sons took upon themselves the mission of bringing their late father's dream to fruition.

This they did by distributing Spencer's previously unpublished book, Spencerian Key to Practical Penmanship, in 1866. Spencerian script became the standard across the United States and remained so until the 1920s when the spreading popularity of the typewriter rendered its use as a prime method of business communication obsolete.

Despite its prominence in America and its school curriculum, the Spencerian Method for script fell largely due to society's need for a faster, "simpler" script to allow telegraphers to translate Morse code directly into writing. This 'modern need' led to the Palmer Method's rise as Austin Palmer simplified the Spencerian style to create an even 'speedier' method. The development of people's artistic ability/penmanship along with higher quality, more refined tools and materials would lead to the creation of Ornamental Script, a Spencerian script variant. It was gradually replaced in primary schools with the Palmer Method, a simplified version.

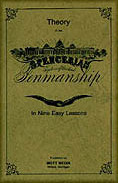
P. R. Spencer's book, published 1866

== Features ==
In the Spencerian Method, complicated capital letters were written in a series of strokes without moving the pen away from the paper as it was meant to be rhythmic and comfortable. Its lowercase letters are key in separating Spencerian script from its predecessor, copperplate script, otherwise known as English roundhand, as Spencerian lowercase letters tend to look more delicate and less shaded than those of copperplate (shading entirely absent from 'i', vertical ascender of 't' and 'd' and the descender stem of 'p'). Spencerian is written with a slant of 52 degrees, measured counterclockwise from the baseline.

== Continued use ==
The text in Ford Motor Company's logo is written in Spencerian script, as is the Coca-Cola logo. It is speculated and highly likely that F. M. Robinson, a bookkeeper said to have named Coca-Cola, was trained in business and penmanship at Spencerian school, and suggested that it be engraved "Spencerian style." Even though Robinson said he also wrote/made the original script form for the logo alongside Frank Ridge in a court case in 1914, one of Louis Madarasz's pupils claims that the man himself said to him that he made it during the height of his mail-order business for Robinson or Ridge and forgot about it as Coca-Cola had a relatively small and slow start.

Although the current Coca-Cola logo dates from 1946, it retains all the features of the Spencerian script from F. M. Robinson's design of 1886.

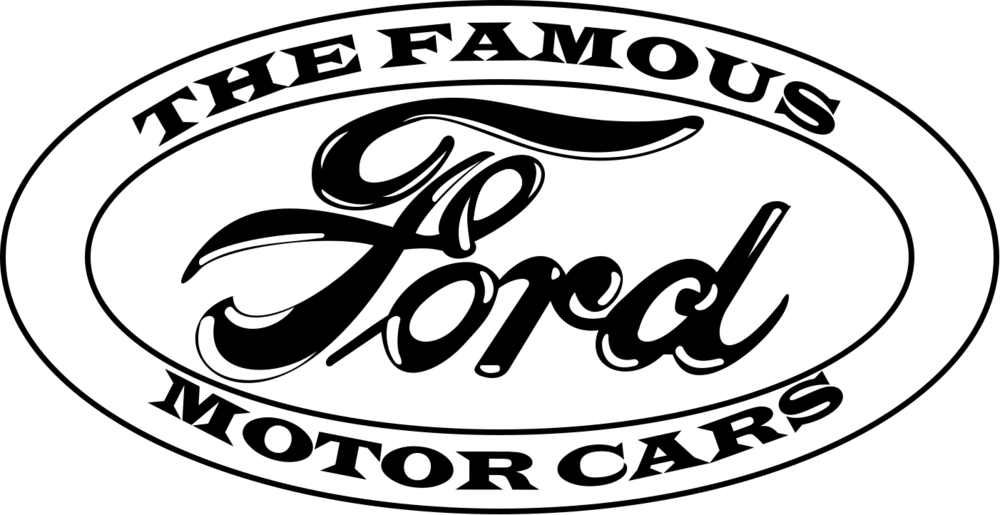
Ford logo from 1911, predating the simplifications of 1927

== See also ==
- Copperplate script, a style of calligraphic writing most commonly associated with English Roundhand
- D'Nealian, a style of writing and teaching cursive and manuscript adapted from the Palmer Method
- Palmer Method, a form of penmanship instruction developed in the late 19th century that replaced Spencerian script as the most popular handwriting system in the United States
- Round hand, a style of handwriting and calligraphy originating in England in the 1660s
- Teaching script
- Zaner-Bloser, another streamlined form of Spencerian script
