= Regional handwriting variation =

Although people in many parts of the world share common alphabets and numeral systems (versions of the Latin writing system are used throughout the Americas, Australia, and much of Europe and Africa; the Western Arabic numerals are nearly universal), styles of handwritten letterforms vary between individuals, and sometimes also vary systematically between regions.

== Western Arabic numerals ==
The handwritten numerals used in Western countries have two common forms:

- "In-line" or "full-height" form is similar to that used on typewriters and is taught in North America; in this form all numerals have the same height as the majuscule alphabet (i.e. the capital letters).
- In "old style" text figures, numerals 0, 1 and 2 are x-height; numerals 6 and 8 have bowls within x-height, plus ascenders; numerals 3, 5, 7 and 9 have descenders from x-height, with 3 resembling ʒ; and the numeral 4 extends a short distance both up and down from x-height. Old-style numerals are often used by British presses.

Aside from these two main forms, other regional variations abound.

The numeral 0: Some writers put a diagonal slash through the numeral 0 (zero), a practice that was used on some early, low-resolution computer terminals which displayed a slashed "zero" glyph to distinguish it from the capital letter O. This practice conflicts with the use of the letter "Ø" in the Danish and Norwegian languages. Forms that avoid this confusion include:

- a dot placed in the centre of zero
- the use of a tick, that is, a slash that does not cross the entire bowl of the figure, but lies completely in the upper right
- a form found in Germany with a vertical slash
- a form with a slash from upper left to lower right.

Confusion between the numeral 0 and the letter O can also be resolved by using a script letter O (with a loop at the top).

The numeral 1: This numeral is sometimes written with a serif at the top extending downward and to the left. People in some parts of Europe extend this stroke nearly the whole distance to the baseline. It is sometimes written with a horizontal serif at the base; without the serif it can resemble the shape of the numeral 7, which has a near-vertical stroke without a crossbar, and a shorter horizontal top stroke. This numeral is often written as a plain vertical line without an ear at the top; this form is easily confused with a capital I, a lower-case L, a Roman 50 and a vertical bar |.

The numeral 2: In the U.S., Germany and Austria, a curly version used to be taught and is still used by many in handwriting. This too can be confused with a capital script Q, or the letter Z. It appears as ੨.

The numeral 3: This numeral is sometimes written with a flat top, similar to the character Ʒ (ezh). This form is sometimes used to prevent people from fraudulently changing a three into an eight (but introduces the potential for confusion with ezh or with cursive Z).

The numeral 4: Some people leave the top "open": all the lines are either vertical or horizontal, as in a seven-segment display. This makes it easier to distinguish from the numeral 9. Whether the horizontal bar terminates at or crosses the right vertical bar is insignificant in the West, but to be distinguished from certain Chinese characters (particularly 丩), it must cross.

The numeral 5: In Taiwan, the left vertical bar is extended upwards as a long stem. If this is slanted, the overall figure may more closely resemble an uppercase Y. If casually written it can be confused with the letter S.

The numeral 6: Can be confused with a letter capital G, or the lowercase b, or the nine if inverted. In situations where the number 6 may appear at various angles (such as on billiard balls, some styles of playing cards and dice), it can be underlined (appearing as 6) or followed by a full stop (appearing as 6.) to indicate the proper viewing angle to disambiguate between 6 and 9; a 9 may or may not appear with similar underlining or full stop (as 9 or 9.). It can also be written with a straight line rather than a right-curling ascender on top, appearing as b.

The numeral 7: The traditional form found in copperplate penmanship begins with a serif at the upper left and has a wavy horizontal stroke (like a swash). In East Asian countries (Korea, China and Japan), this numeral is commonly written with such a serif, but no swash and no crossbar through the middle. It is usually written with just two strokes, the top horizontal and the (usually angled) vertical. A short horizontal bar is sometimes used to cross the vertical in the middle, to distinguish the seven from a numeral one, especially in cultures (such as French) that write 1 with a very long upstroke. This form is used commonly throughout continental Europe, parts of the United States and frequently in Australia. In Taiwan two horizontal bars are sometimes used, although an extra-long serif is the feature which most clearly distinguishes 7 from 1. When the cross is added in the center it can cause confusion with a script capital F.

The numeral 9: In parts of Europe, this numeral is written with the vertical ending in a hook at the bottom. This version resembles how the lowercase g is commonly written. Elsewhere the usual shape is to draw the vertical straight to the baseline. A nine may or may not appear with underlining or full stop (as 9 or 9.) in order to avoid confusion with 6. In China, southern Taiwan, and South Korea, the nine is sometimes written with the loop to the right of the stick, resembling a capital P or Greek lowercase letter ρ.

Confusion of 4 and 6: Many American hands write the bowl of the digit 6 definitely to the right of the ascender moreso than stacked below it. A similar shape represents 4 in many European hands, where the end of horizontal stroke may continue into the top beginning of the righthand vertical stroke. Especially if the American 6's bowl is taller or if the end of the stroke crosses past the bottom, or if the European 4's righthand stem is squatter or if it doesn't fully cross past the horizontal, both of which are not uncommon variations, these two can be exactly identical.

== The Latin writing system ==
The lowercase letter a: This letter is often handwritten as the single-storey "ɑ" (a circle and a vertical line adjacent to the right of the circle) instead of the double-storey "a" found in many fonts. (See: A § Typographic variants)

The lowercase letter g: In Polish, this letter is often rendered with a straight descender without a hook or loop. This effectively means that a handwritten g looks much like a q in other writing traditions. The letter q, which is only used in foreign words and is extremely rare, is then disambiguated from g by adding a serif (often undulated) extending to the right from the bottom tip of the descender.

The lowercase letter k: Some people write this letter with a loop.

The lowercase letter p: The French way of writing this character has a half-way ascender as the vertical extension of the descender, which also does not complete the bowl at the bottom. In early Finnish writing, the curve to the bottom was omitted, thus the resulting letter resembled an n with a descender (like ꞃ).

The lowercase letter q: In block letters, some Europeans like to cross the descender to prevent confusion with the numeral 9, which also can be written with a straight stem. In North America the descender often ends with a hook curving up to the right. In Polish, the lowercase q is disambiguated from g by a serif extending from the bottom tip of the descender to the right.

The lowercase letter s: See long s.

The lowercase letters u and v: These letters have a common origin and were once written according to the location in the word rather than the sound. The v came first; the u originally had a loop extending to the left and was only used to start words. All other locations for either u or v were written with the latter.

Double letters : Some hands in Spanish or other languages with the double-ll digraph cross the l's, forming a shape similar to a capital X. Writers whose languages make common use of double-ff or especially double-tt will very often use a single horizontal stroke across the pair (ﬀ, ~~ƖƖ~~), even in otherwise non-ligature printing script.

The uppercase letter I: This letter is often written with one stroke on the top of the letter and one on the bottom. This distinguishes it from the lowercase letter l, and the numeral 1, which is often written as a straight line without the ear.

The uppercase letter J: In Germany, this letter is often written with a long stroke to the left at the top. This is to distinguish it from the capital letter "I".

The uppercase letter S: In Japan, this letter is often written with a single serif added to the end of the stroke.

The uppercase letter Z: This letter is usually written with three strokes. In parts of Europe such as Italy, Germany and Spain, it is commonly written with a short horizontal crossbar added through the middle. This version is sometimes preferred in mathematics to help distinguish it from the numeral 2. In Polish, the character Ƶ is used as an allographic variant of the letter Ż. In Japan it is often written with a short diagonal crossbar through the middle. In France, it is often written with a loop at the bottom.

The lowercase letter z: In the cursive style used in the United States and most Australian states (excluding South Australia), this letter is written as an ezh (ʒ). The parts of Europe that add a crossbar to the uppercase ⟨Z⟩ may also use it the lowercase version.

Digraphs: Even in printing scripts where letters are otherwise separate, English hands will often connect the very common Th digraph, connecting the right end of the top-stroke of an initial capital T directly onto the beginning of the top of the ascender of the following h, and in the lowercase often slanting the cross of the t up to the right to likewise meet the beginning of the h's ascender. Similarly, Dutch handwriting often connects the digraph Ij, forming a ligature which appears similar to a У or ÿ in upper- or lower-case, respectively. (These ligatures are present in Unicode as Ĳ and ĳ, which may be rendered in a browser as either У/ÿ or IJ/ij)

== Kurrent and Sütterlin script ==
German Kurrent and its modernized 20th-century school version Sütterlin, the form of handwriting taught in schools and generally used in Germany and Austria until it was banned by the Nazis in 1941, was very different from that used in other European countries. However, it was generally only used for German words. Any foreign words included in the text would usually be written in the "normal" script, which was called the lateinische Schrift (Latin script) in German.

== Slant ==
Slant is the predominant angle of the downward stroke in handwriting based on Latin script. The slant of a sample of writing is a feature of many regional handwriting variations, and also a reflection of the copybook that is taught.

== Examples ==
Comparison of Latin script cursive in different regions

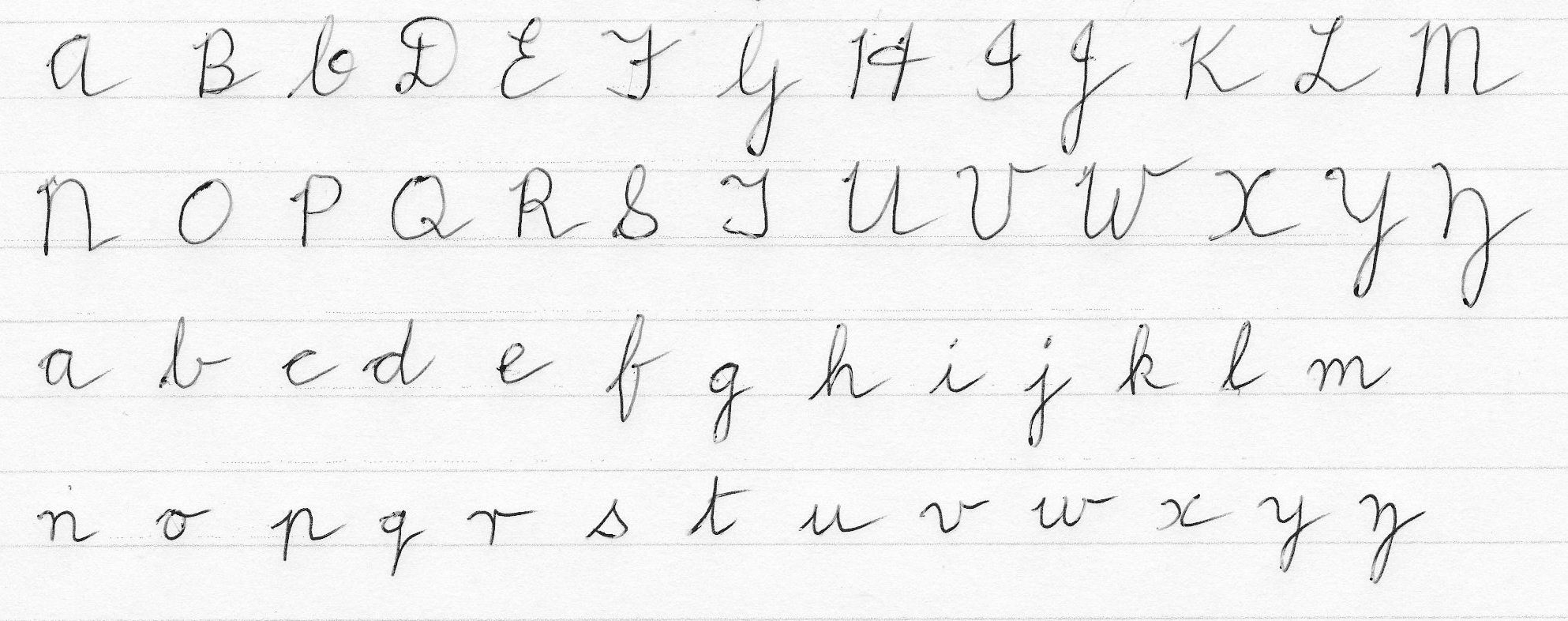
English-language handwriting as taught in Britain during the twentieth century.

English-language, D’Nealian method cursive.

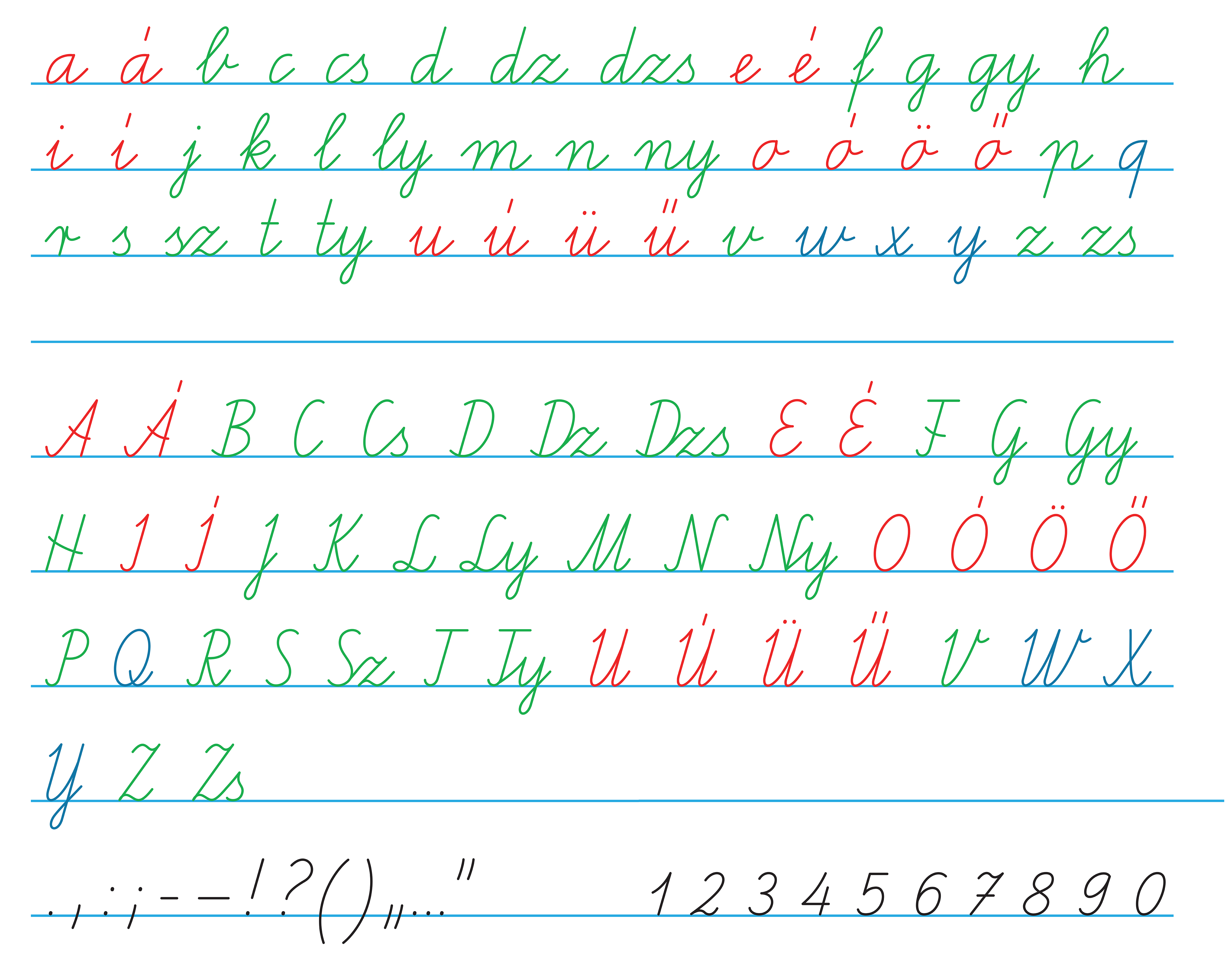
Cursive in Hungarian, with vowels in red (letters in blue are not used in children's education).

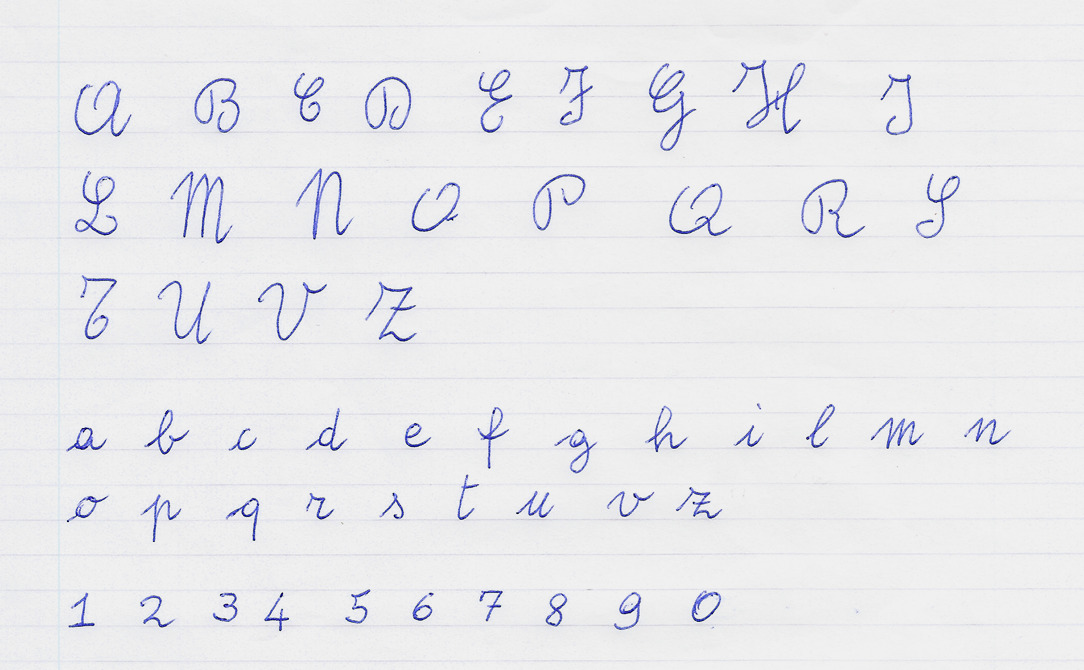
Upper- and lower-case handwritten cursive letters and numbers as usually taught in Italy

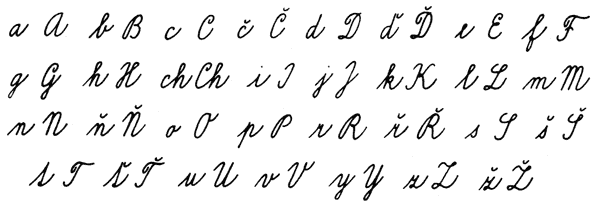
Czech cursive, 1958 standard; the letters "M" and "N" were updated in the 1980s

== See also ==
- Arabic numeral variations
- Null (disambiguation)
- Ø (disambiguation)
- 0 (disambiguation)
- ʘ
- ⱺ
- List of Latin-script letters
- Q with hook tail
- Regional language
- Slashed zero
- Symbols for zero
- Z with stroke
- Zero (disambiguation)
