= Palmer Method =

Teaching cursive and learning method

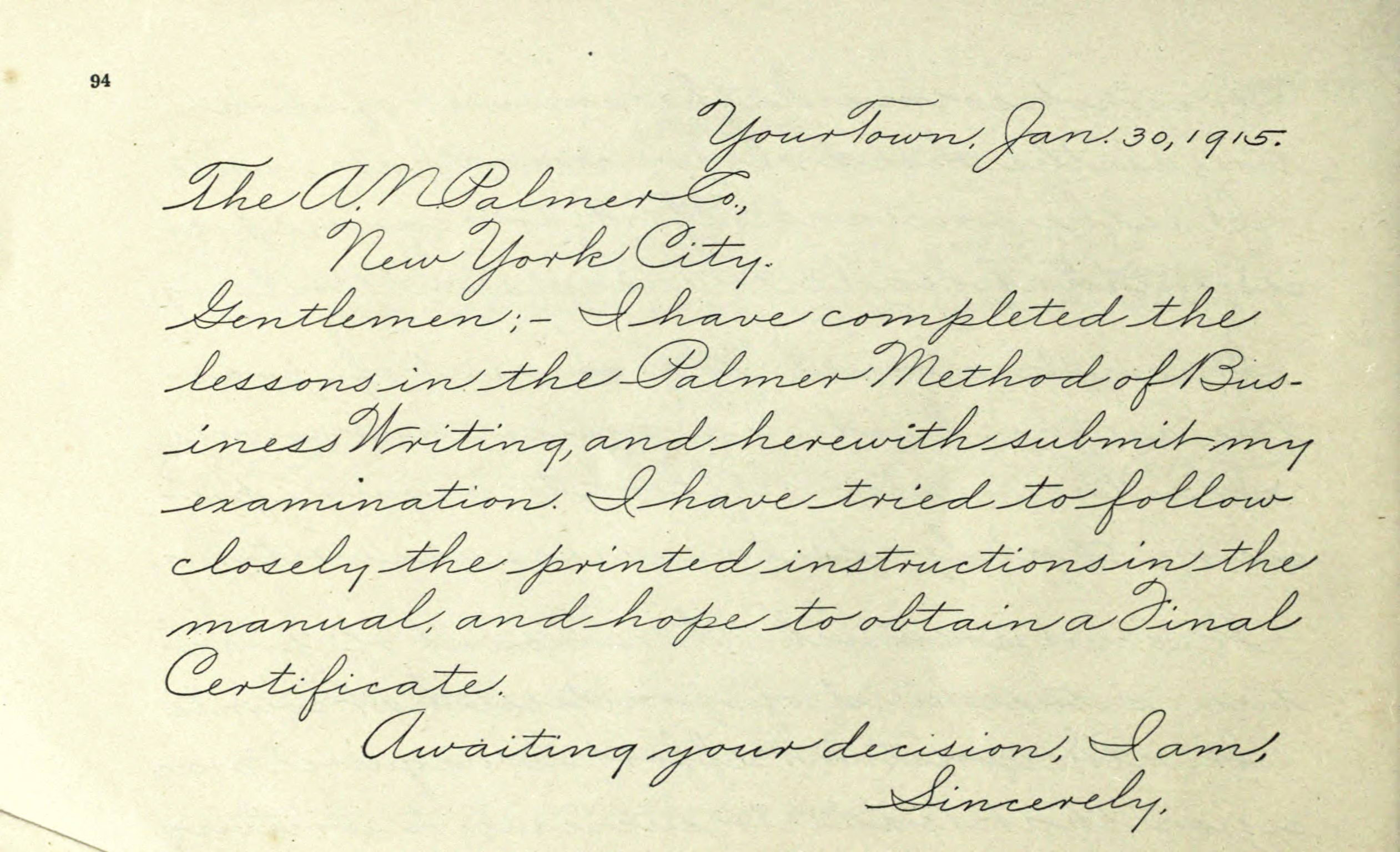
Sample writing from The Palmer Method of Business Writing

The Palmer Method of penmanship instruction was developed and promoted by Austin Palmer in the late 19th and early 20th centuries. It was intended to simplify the earlier Spencerian method, which had been the main handwriting learning method since the 1840s. The Palmer Method soon became the most popular handwriting system in the United States.

Under the method, students were taught to adopt a uniform system of cursive writing with rhythmic elliptical motions.

== History ==
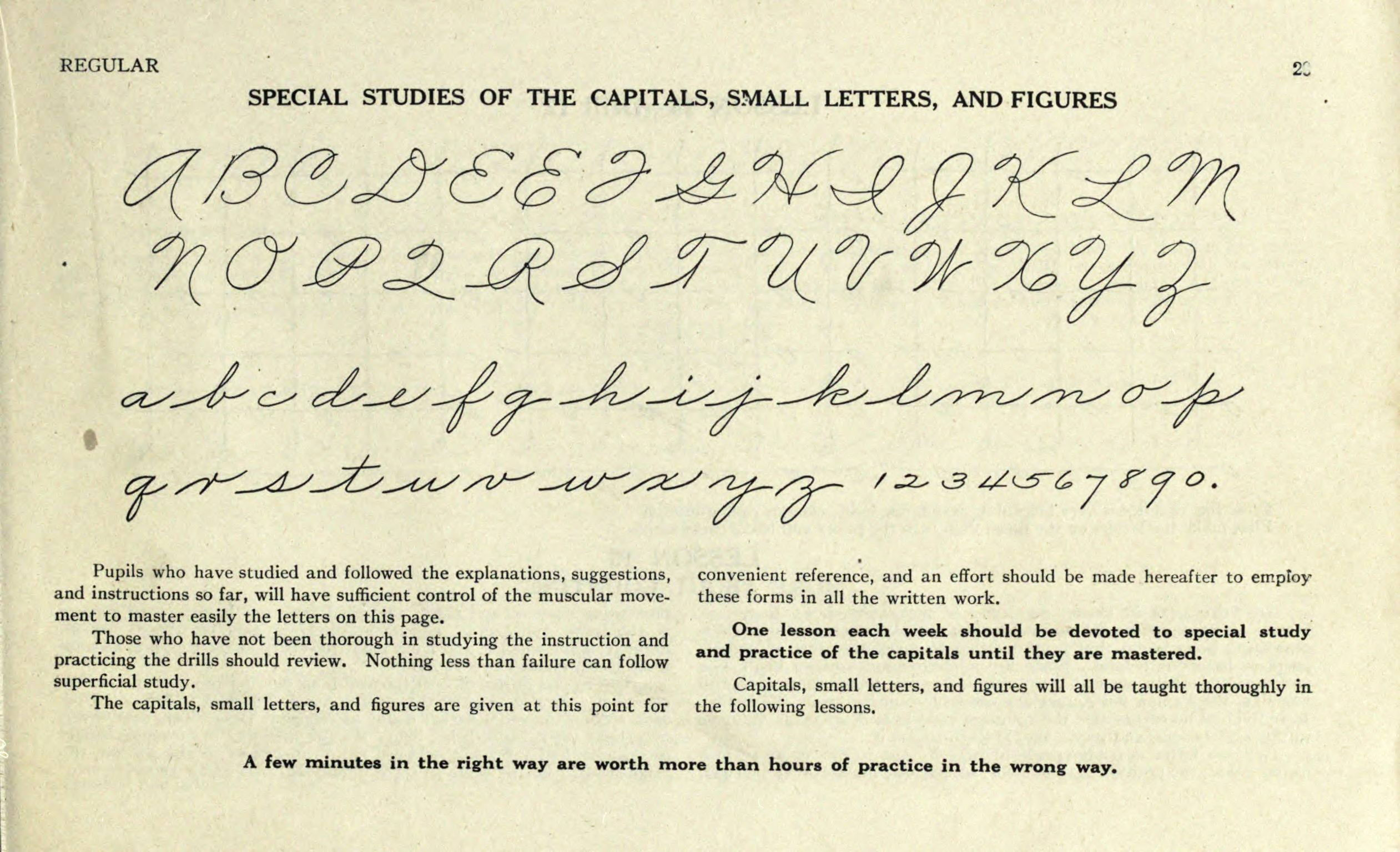
Alphabet and numerals from The Palmer Method of Business Writing

The method developed around 1888 and was introduced in the book Palmer's Guide to Business Writing (1894). Palmer's method involved "muscle motion" in which the more proximal muscles of the arm were used for movement, rather than allowing the fingers to move in writing. In spite of opposition from the major publishers, this textbook enjoyed great success: in 1912, one million copies were sold throughout the United States. The method won awards, including the Gold Medal at the Panama Pacific Exposition in San Francisco, in 1915, and the Gold Medal at the Sesquicentennial Exposition in Philadelphia, in 1926.

Proponents of the Palmer Method emphasized its plainness and speed, that it was much faster than the laborious Spencerian Method, and that it allowed the writer to compete effectively with the typewriter. To educators, the method's advocates emphasized regimentation, and that the method would thus be useful in schools to increase discipline and character, and could even reform delinquents.

The Palmer Method began to fall out of popularity in the 1950s and was eventually supplanted by the Zaner-Bloser Method, which sought to teach children print writing (also called "manuscript printing") before teaching them cursive, in order to provide them with a means of written expression as soon as possible, and thus develop writing skills. The D'Nealian Method, introduced in 1978, sought to address problems raised by the Zaner-Bloser Method, aimed at making the transition from print writing to cursive easier for learners. The Palmer company stopped publishing in the 1980s.

== Legacy ==
In radar engineering, a Palmer Scan is a scanning technique that produces a scanning beam by moving the main antenna and its feed in a circular motion. The name was derived from the looping circles practiced by students of the Palmer Method.

== See also ==
- D'Nealian, a style of writing and teaching cursive and manuscript adapted from the Palmer Method
- Zaner-Bloser script, another streamlined form of Spencerian script
- Library hand another 19th-century script developed by Melvil Dewey and Thomas Edison
- Round hand, a style of handwriting and calligraphy originating in England in the 1660s
- Regional handwriting variation
- Teaching script
- Engraving

== Bibliography ==
- Gard, Caroll (1937). Writing Past and Present. New York: A. N. Palmer Company.
- Thornton, Tamara Plakins (1996). Handwriting in America. New Haven: Yale University Press. ISBN 0-300-06477-2.
