= Block letters =

Style of writing Latin script

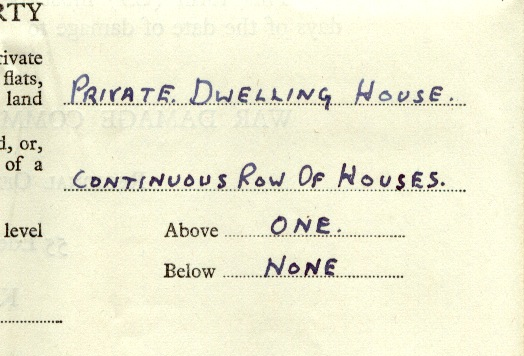
Detail of a form filled in with handwritten small caps

Block letters (known as printscript, manuscript, print writing, printing or ball and stick in academics) are a sans-serif (or "gothic") style of writing Latin script in which the letters are individual glyphs, with no joining.

Elementary education in English-speaking countries typically introduces children to the literacy of handwriting using a method of block letters (commonly referred to as manuscript by educators), which may later advance to cursive (joined) penmanship. The policy of teaching cursive in American elementary schools has varied over time, from strict endorsement such as the Palmer method in the early 20th century, to removal by Common Core in 2010, to being reinstated.

On official forms, one is often asked to "please print". This is because cursive handwriting is harder to read, and the glyphs are joined so they do not fit neatly into separate boxes.

Block letters may also be used as to refer to block capitals, which means writing in all capital letters or in large and small capital letters, imitating the style of typeset capital letters. However, in at least one court case involving patents, the term "block letters" was found to include both upper and lower case.

Handwritten block letters generally can be digitalised more accurately by optical character recognition than handwritten cursive scripts. Block letters are naturally used in crossword puzzles.
