= Teaching script =

Sample script for learning penmanship

Getty-Dubay Italic, an American teaching script

A teaching script is a sample script that serves as a visual orientation for learning to write by hand. In the sense of a guideline or a prototype, it supports the demanding process of developing handwriting skills and abilities in a visual and illustrative way.

Teaching scripts are represented as alphabets (upper and lower case letters), which are generally accompanied by numbers and punctuation marks. For detailed information on the execution of movements and the design of individual letters and their incorporation into words, various learning materials such as writing exercise sheets or corresponding exercise books are usually provided.

== Historical context ==
Historically, the older approach was to provide students with a beautiful, readable, and efficient cursive as a standard script for learning. Students were supposed to bring their writing closer and closer to this perfect model. In the first third of the 20th century, type teachers such as Rudolf von Larisch and Ludwig Sütterlin changed this traditional approach by defining the teaching script as a starting point instead of a target model.

The teaching script does not represent a desired target script. It therefore does not have to be particularly beautiful or efficient, but above all simple and clear. The students should develop an individual handwriting from it. The fact that this goal is not always achieved does not change the popularity of the concept.

In 1916, the writing pedagogue Fritz Kuhlmann took an even more far-reaching approach: the students should develop an individual handwriting from block letters rather than from a teaching cursive. The urge for speed should lead the pupil to invent combinations of letters and fluid, uninterrupted strokes himself. This approach did not prove successful at the time, but it was revived in 2011 under the name Grundschrift ("basic script") and has been tested again since then.

== Basics ==
Italian cursive script, taught since the 1970s

The following information is included in a teaching script:

- the character of the line as a formative element (for example, a monoline nib stroke, a broad nib stroke or a pointed nib stroke),
- the ratio of line width to font size,
- the design of the characteristic features of the individual characters,
- the size and width proportions of the letters and their shape elements,
- the position of their main axes (inclination angle),
- the connections and ligatures and
- the execution of movements in detail and as a whole (ductus).

In Germany, teaching scripts are part of the curriculum for German lessons. It contains statements about the binding nature of the respective template.

Furthermore, teaching scripts have the function of illustrating the coordination of the individual aspects of the design (angle of inclination, proportions of size and width, reversal of movement in the form of angles, arcs, cover lines or loops, letter spacing and connections). In this way, teaching scripts demonstrate a certain style principle that helps learners not only to give the individual letters an unmistakable shape, but also to establish a certain visual order in the script. Such an order is aimed at combining the parts into an easily comprehensible whole and is an essential prerequisite for the legibility of the scripts. Lineaments are an aid in the difficult process of ordering. There are different views on the use of lineages when learning to write.

The design of teaching scripts represents the interface between type design and the didactics of native speaker teaching. Learning to write by means of graphomotor skills is one aspect of the very complex process of learning to write in primary school. In the history of writing education, the concepts of how to structure the process of acquiring skills and abilities in handwritten writing have undergone major changes. This has an impact on the form of the respective teaching scripts.

== Development in German-speaking countries ==
=== Holy Roman Empire ===
In the German-speaking parts of the Holy Roman Empire, after the Carolingian minuscule (9th–12th centuries), a cursive writing style had prevailed, building on the Gothic cursive (from the 14th century) – an italic form of Gothic writing in everyday use (from the 12th century). This development was continued by the Nuremberg master scribe Johann Neudörffer (1497–1563), who had played a decisive role in the creation of Fraktur. In his writing book "Eine gute Ordnung und kurze unterricht [...]" (Nuremberg, 1538), he created a unified style from letters of German cursive scripts – more precisely German Kurrent scripts – which has been around for a long time. With the spread of the school system from the 16th century onwards, reading and writing skills became commonplace among ever more diverse classes.

Alongside the German Kurrent, the humanistic cursive developed as a script for Latin and non-German texts, and from this the Latin cursive evolved. In the German-speaking world it was necessary and common for educated people to learn two scripts, the German and the Latin script.

=== Germany ===
==== Standard and teaching scripts until 1941 ====
In 1714, a decree in Prussia for the first time introduced a standard script, which is said to go back to the Berlin teacher Hilmar Curas (Joachimsthalsches Gymnasium). Its pointed, right-leaning forms, which largely avoided curves, also became naturalized in other German territories and became characteristic of German Kurrent scripts.

The Berlin graphic artist Ludwig Sütterlin (1865–1917) changed this typical style of the German Kurrent script. He relied entirely on the concept of the teaching script – which as such need be neither beautiful nor efficient, but above all clear and simple – as well as the monoline nib for beginners. He developed his own typeface, which stood vertically on the line, divided ascenders, corpus size and descenders in a 1:1:1 ratio, and had geometric-looking spikes and curls. The Sütterlin script – which existed in two variants, as German (Kurrent) and Latin script – was used in Prussian schools in 1924 and from 1930 in most other German countries as the school teaching script.

In Hesse, another typeface pedagogue, Rudolf Koch, developed his own concept, which he presented in 1927: the Offenbacher Schrift. Koch rejected Sütterlin's monoline nib and teaching-script principle. His script – which also existed as German (Kurrent) and Latin script – was written with the broad nib and was in principle to be retained in later life, although it also took on personal traits. However, with the introduction of Sütterlin's script in Hesse in 1930, the Offenbach script remained unused. Likewise, the Stäbchenschrift developed by Maximilian Schlegl in the 1930s did not become established.

In the Third Reich, the Nazi Party Gauleiter Hans Schemm introduced his own teaching script in Bavaria in 1933: the Bavarian "Volksschrift". This contained numerous changes compared to the German Sütterlin script, such as the replacement of the small loops by U-shaped arcs, clear differences in the c, C, d, y, I, J, T and Y, vertical umlaut strokes, the number 7 and curls in the number 0 as well as in the O. The Reich Ministry of Education liked this script, but wanted uniformity throughout the Reich. With a decree of 7 September 1934, which came into force at the beginning of the school year 1935/36, the "Verkehrsschrift" was introduced throughout the Reich. This was a variant of the Bavarian "Volksschrift", in which the writing was slightly tilted to the right. This was possibly a consequence of the realization that in practice not all pupils reached their own handwriting in accordance with the original idea of the original script and that the stencil-like forms of Sütterlin's original script were still to be found in the handwriting of young people.

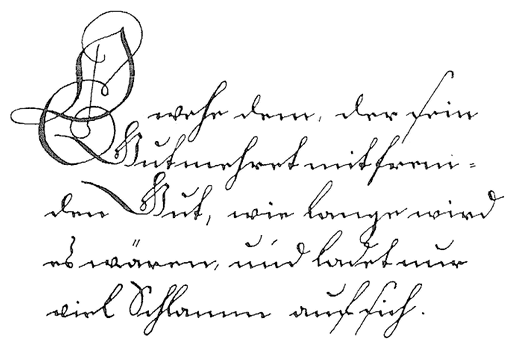
Example of Hilmar Curas, 1714, who shaped the Prussian standard script (Kurrent)

Alphabet of Kurrent writing, c. 1865 (the penultimate line shows the umlauts ä, ö, ü and the corresponding capital letters Ae, Oe, Ue; the last line shows the ligatures ch, ck, th, sch, sz and st)

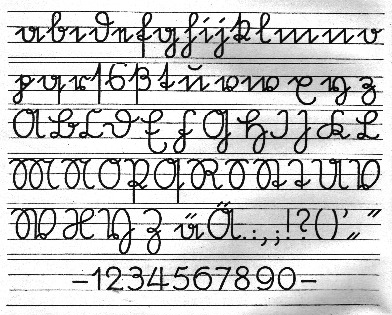
German Sütterlin script, from 1924

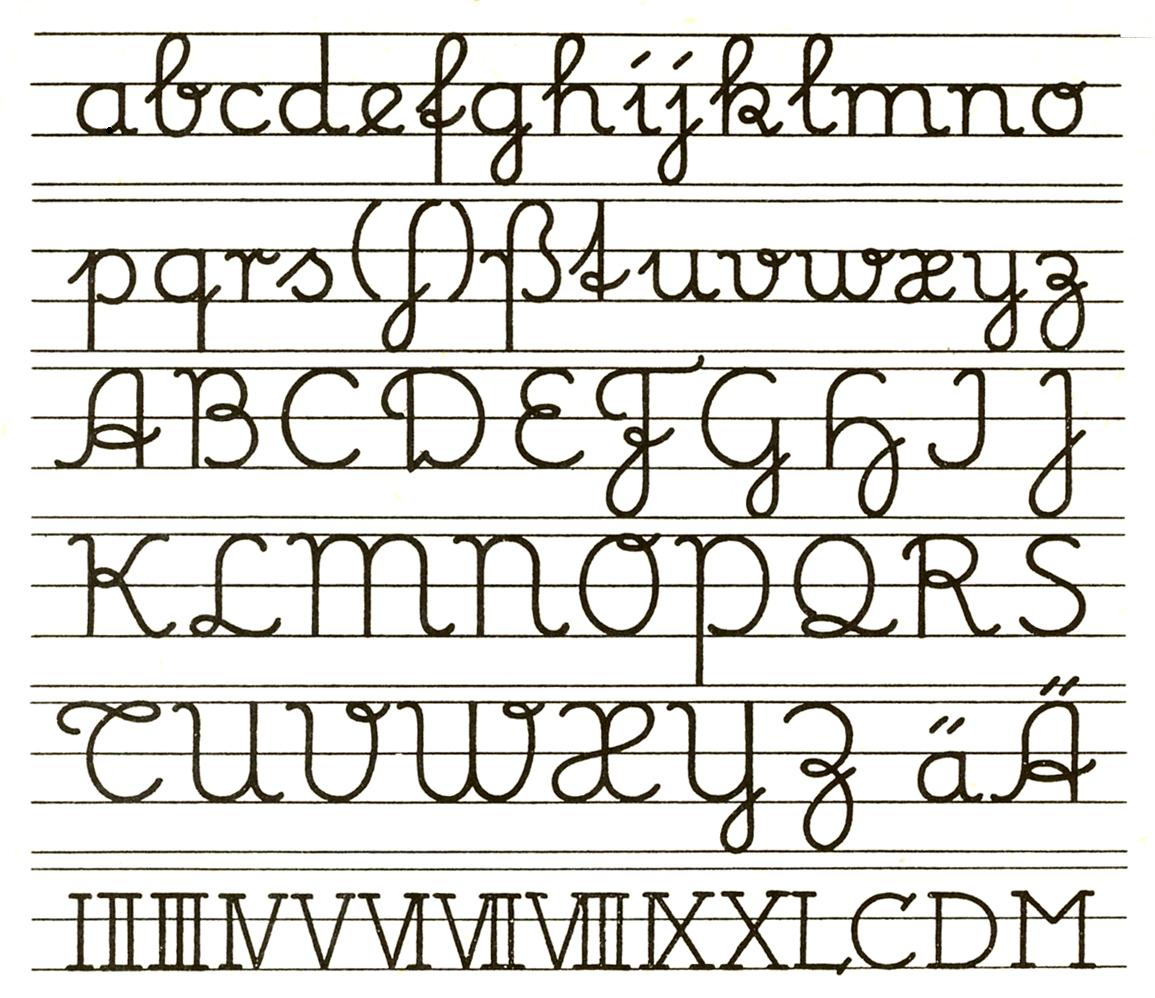
Latin Sütterlin

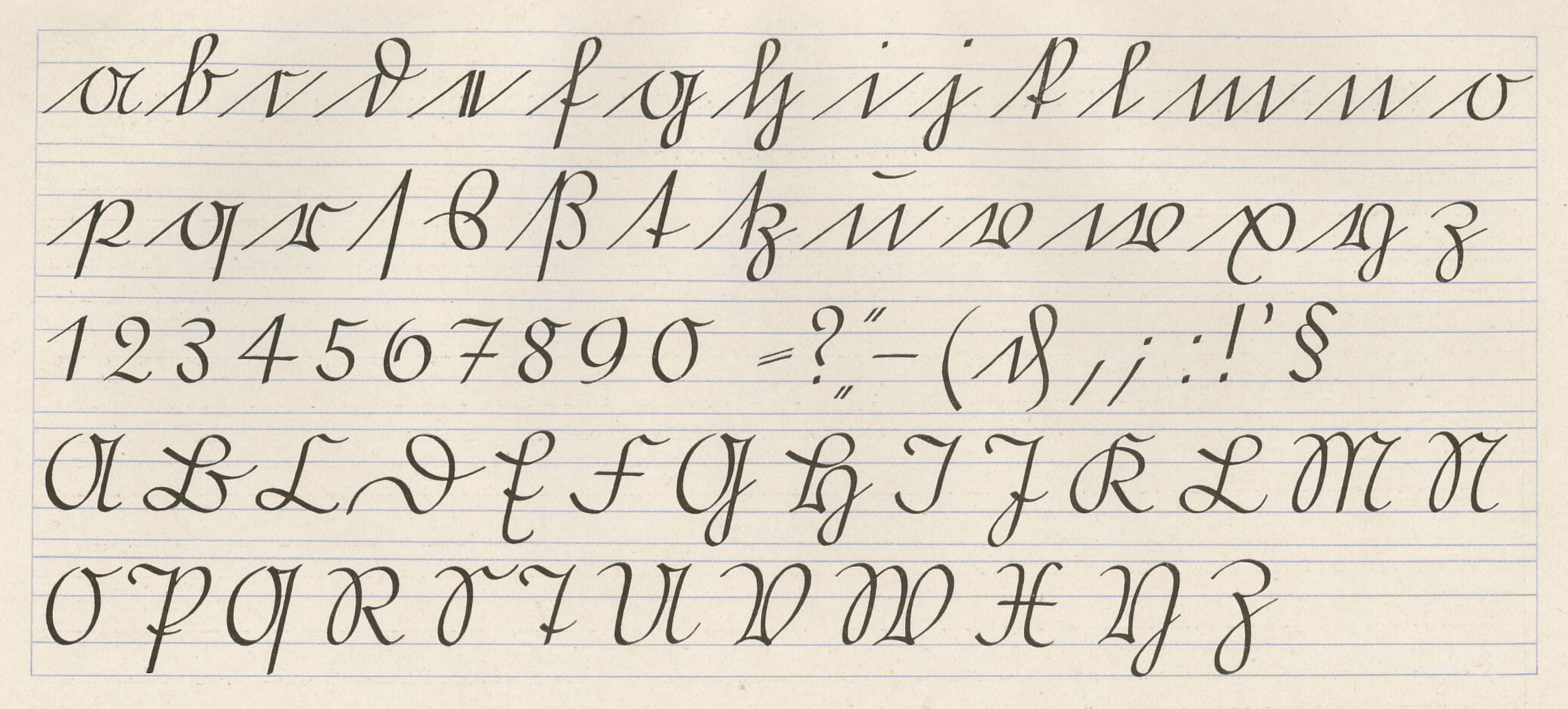
The Offenbach script by Rudolf Koch, German alphabet, 1927

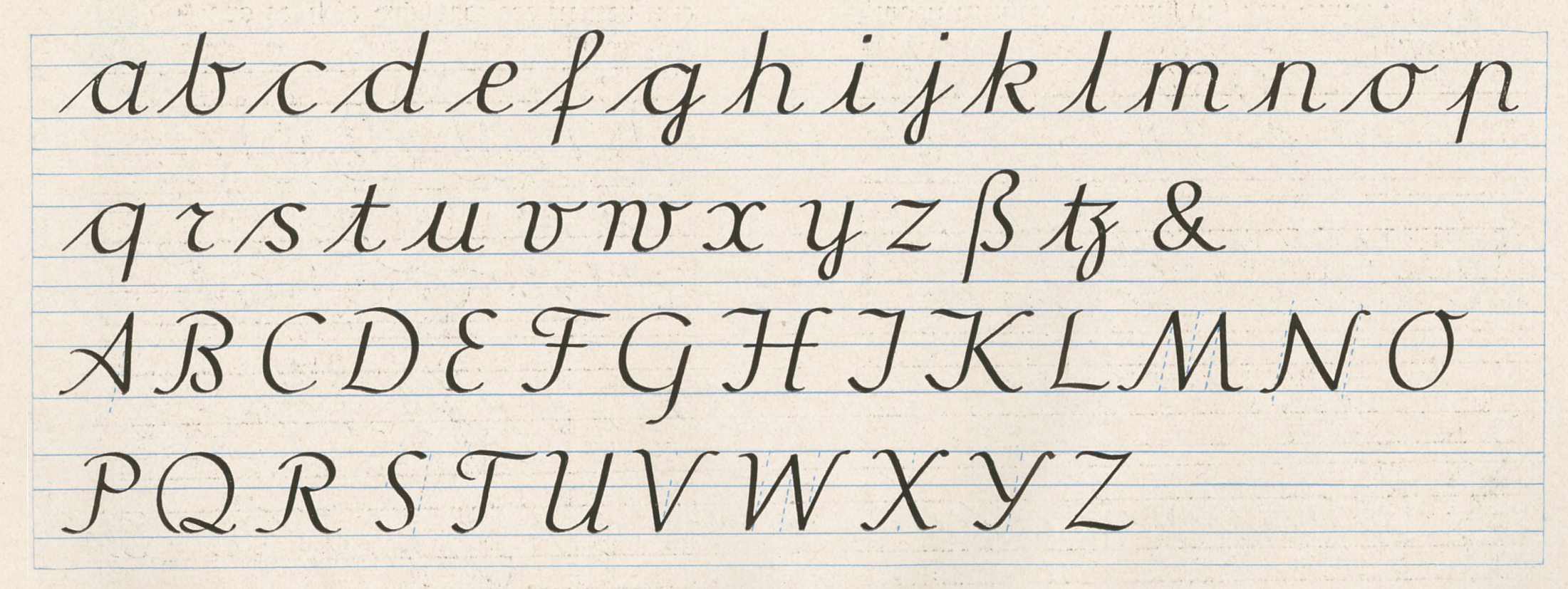
The Offenbach script – Latin alphabet

==== Teaching scripts since 1941 ====
===== Deutsche Normalschrift =====
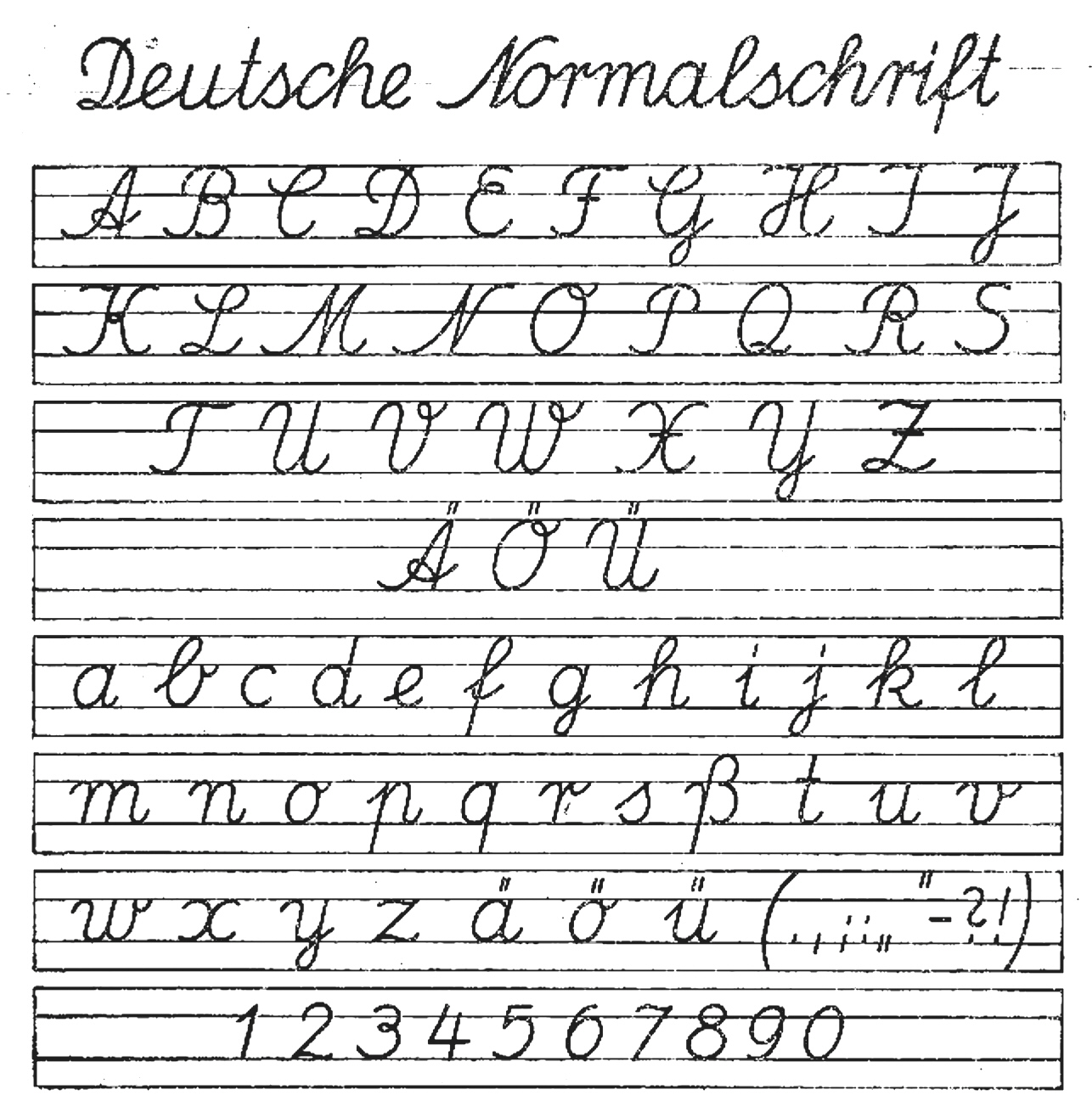
Deutsche Normalschrift, from 1941

In 1941, all broken and Kurrent scripts were abolished by the Normalschrifterlass ("standard script decree") on behalf of Adolf Hitler. Now only the Latin script was taught in schools and everything was changed over to it. For this purpose, a new teaching script was created, which was called "Deutsche Normalschrift". It was developed on the basis of the Latin Sütterlin script, with a right slant, more pleasing forms and simplifications such as the abolition of the loops in the x, X and T and the descender length in the z, Z, F and H, but also the addition of loops in the capital letters C, D and L. The long s was no longer contained in it. The letters N, M, P, T and X, but not V, W and Y, are, similar to the Offenbach script, more closely based on the Antiqua, the P has no descender, and X and Z were given a horizontal line. The number 7 was again written with a diagonal line.

===== Lateinische Ausgangsschrift =====
Lateinische Ausgangsschrift, since 1953

The Lateinische Ausgangsschrift (LA) was developed by the Iserlohner Schreibkreis from the Deutsche Normalschrift and was introduced on 4 November 1953 by the decree of the Conference of Ministers of Education and Cultural Affairs as the school teaching script in the Federal Republic of Germany. In Bavaria, the LA was only introduced in 1966. The Lateinische Ausgangsschrift shows only minor changes compared to the Deutsche Normalschrift. The letter S was given a shape similar to the L, some small loops were turned to pointed turns, x and X got their loops back.

===== Schulausgangsschrift and Vereinfachte Ausgangsschrift =====
In the German Democratic Republic (GDR), a teaching script was initially used which was essentially the same as the LA, with only minor changes such as the letter t or the omission of the horizontal line of the Z.

In connection with the introduction of a new syllabus, this teaching script was changed in 1968. Both didactic and aesthetic reasons were decisive for this. In order to be able to start learning to read block letters at the same time as learning to write cursive, the capital letters were simplified. The sequence of movements in the lower case letters was streamlined. This Schulausgangsschrift (SAS) was partially adopted in the old federal states in 1991.

At the same time, the Vereinfachte Ausgangsschrift (VA) was developed in the Federal Republic of Germany in 1969 to overcome difficulties in the use of the Lateinische Ausgangsschrift. Similar to the SAS, the forms of the VA were brought more into line with the printed letters. For this purpose, it was implemented that almost all lowercase letters begin and also end at the upper middle band, which should standardize the joining of the letters and thus simplify writing. The letter z was given back its descender in the VA. It has been tested since 1972.

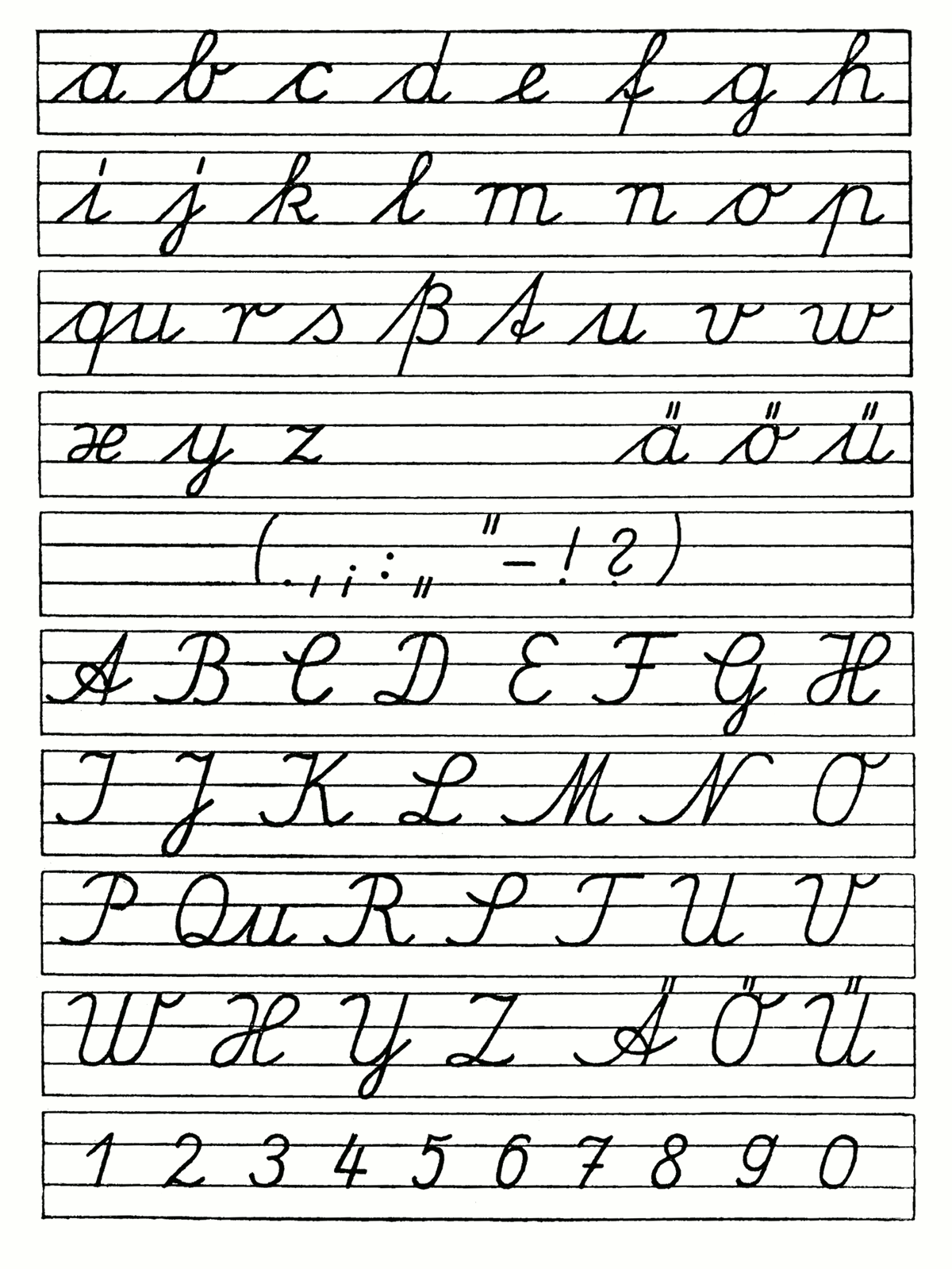
Teaching script of the GDR from 1958

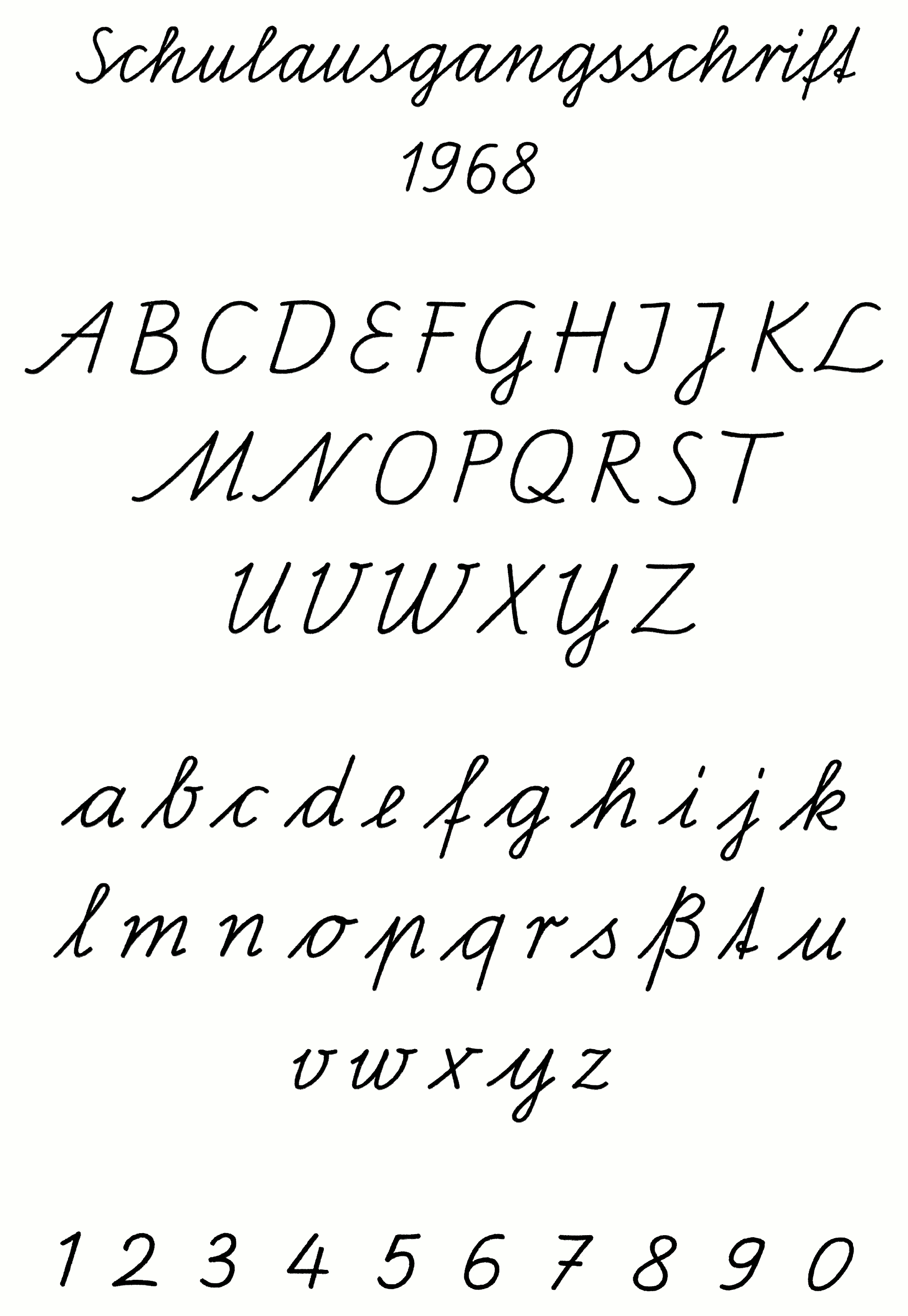
Schulausgangsschrift, in the GDR since 1968

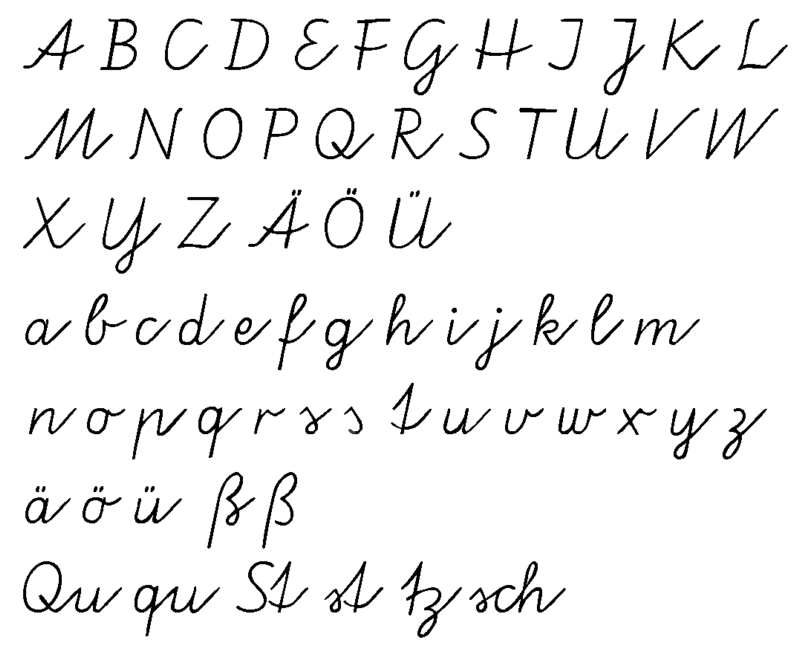
Vereinfachte Ausgangsschrift, since 1972

===== Grundschrift =====
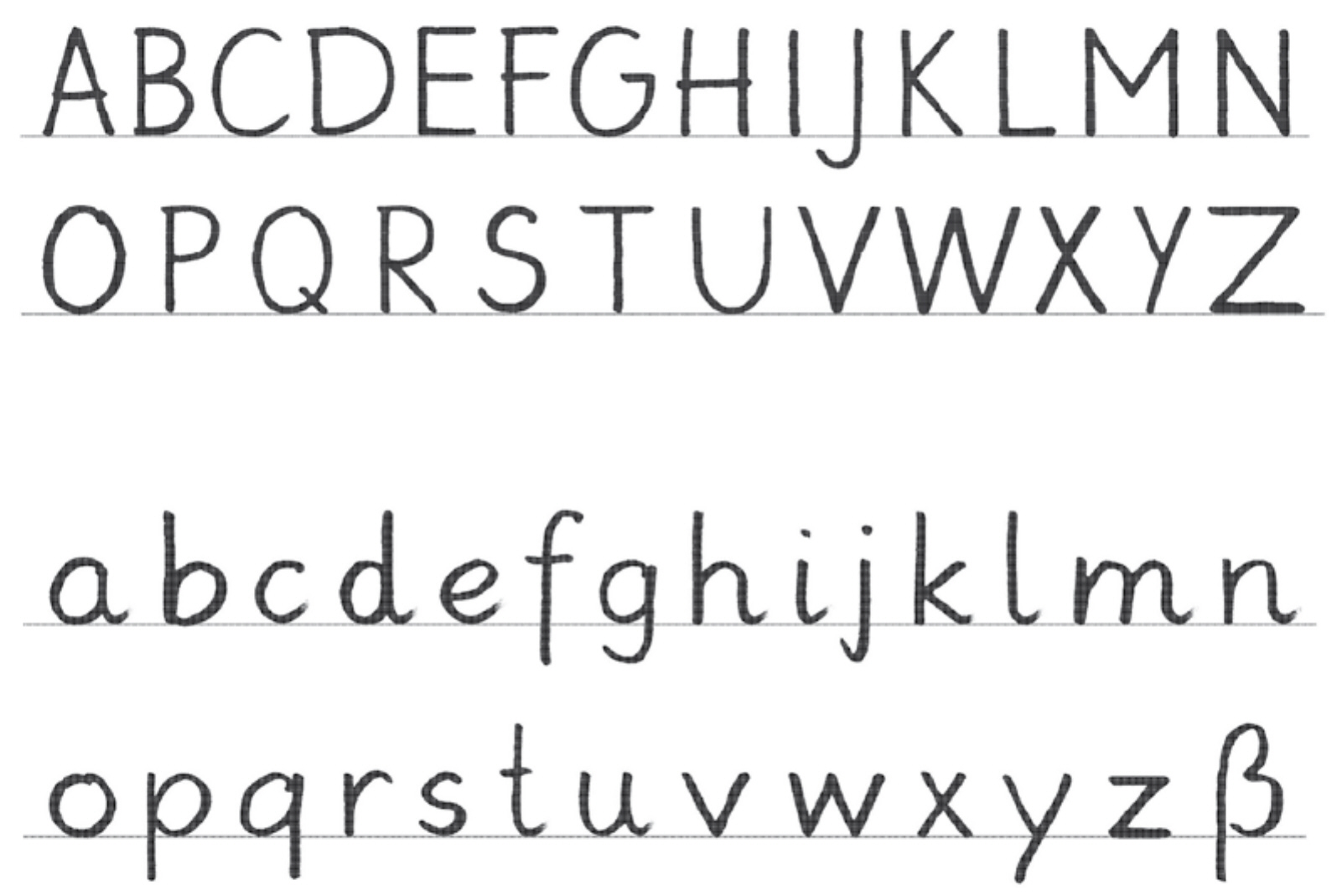
Grundschrift, a teaching script in Hamburg

Since 2011, interested schools in some federal states have been testing a new concept for teaching writing with the Grundschrift, which was developed by a group of experts on behalf of the Grundschulverband. The idea behind the Grundschrift is that cursive is no longer taught in any form whatsoever and that only a printed script is used as the teaching script. The pupils should develop a personal handwriting from the printed script completely independently and without any references.

===== Today =====
In Germany the Lateinische Ausgangsschrift, the Vereinfachte Ausgangsschrift, the Schulausgangsschrift and the Grundschrift are used. It is the task of the respective federal states to issue rules for the use of the scripts, whereby either no script is prescribed, several scripts are available for selection or one script is made mandatory.

=== Austria ===
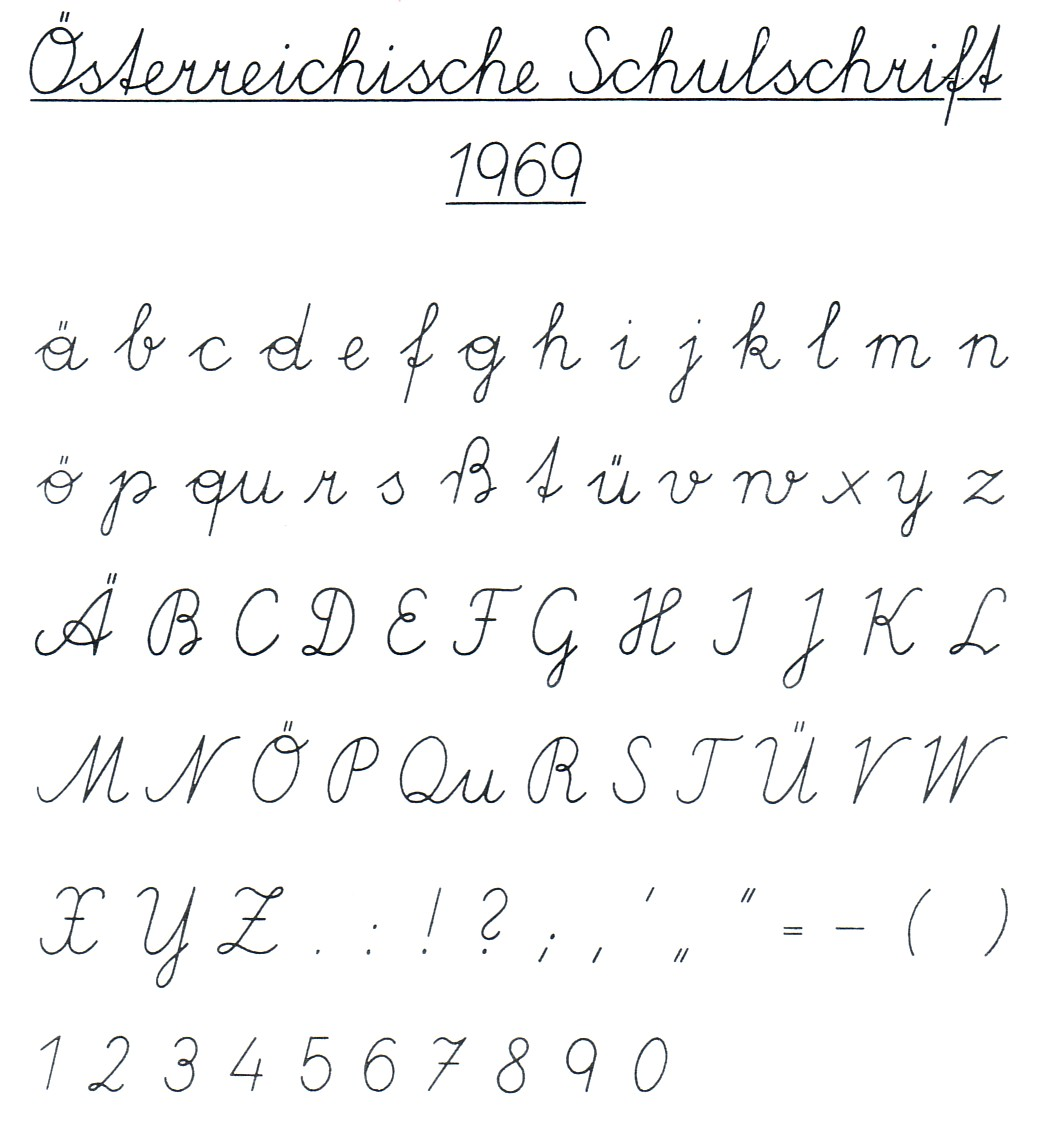
Austrian Schulschrift 1969–1995

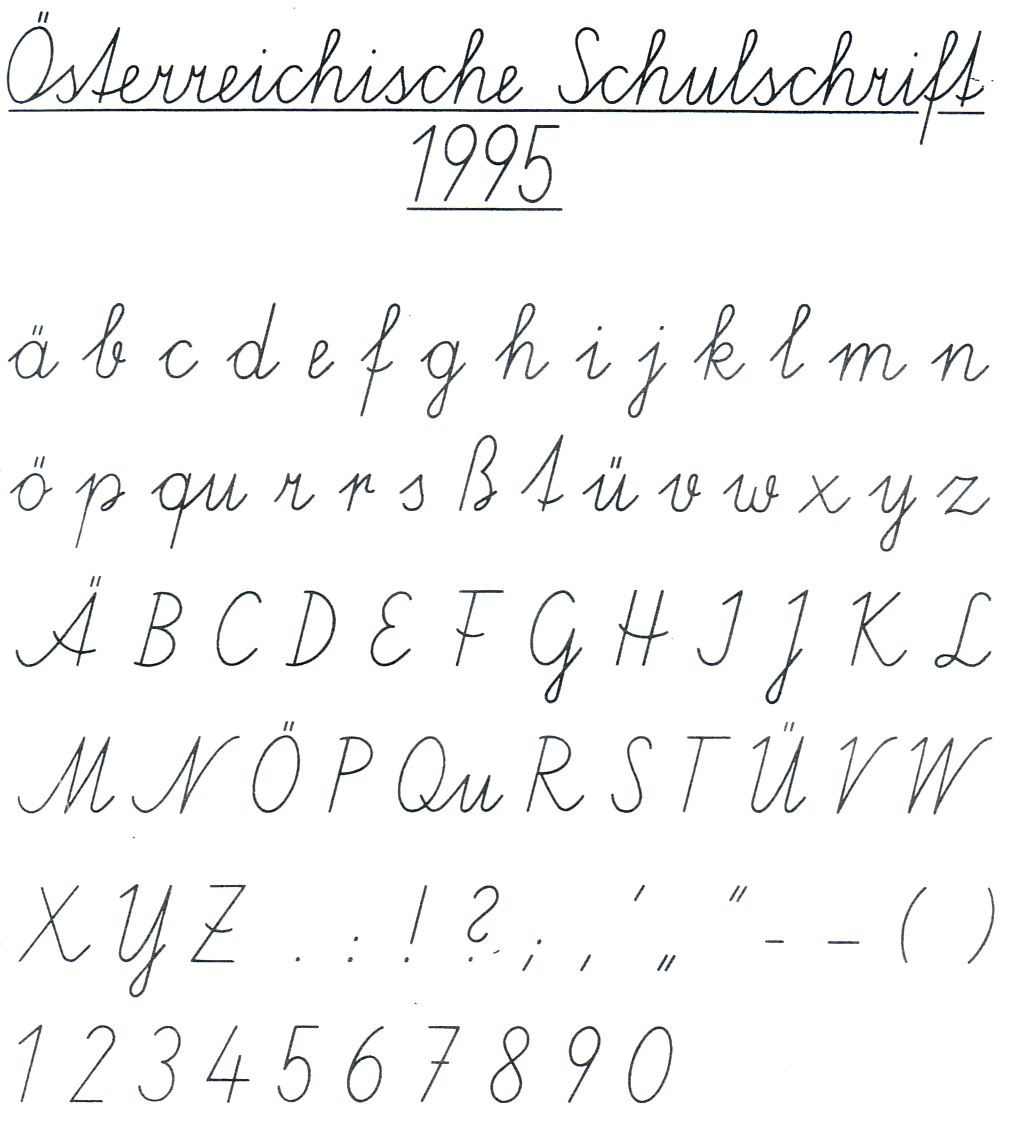
Austrian Schulschrift since 1995

Until the school year 1938/1939, the Kurrent script, established as the "official and protocol script" in the Austrian Empire, was taught and taught as the first script in elementary school. The schoolbooks were set in Fraktur and Kurrent script.

The oldest Austrian Schulschrift dates back to 1775 and was designed by Johann Ignaz von Felbiger ("Anleitung zum Schönschreiben [...] zum Gebrauch der deutschen Schulen in den k.k. Staaten", Vienna 1775) under Empress Maria Theresia. The next standardization dates from 1832, but hardly anyone followed these rules, teachers designed their own templates, sometimes even within a school.

The "Richtformen 1924" were declared binding by the Vienna City School Board, while the other provinces used their own teaching scripts before and also afterwards, in part.

After the annexation of Austria by the Nazi Germany in 1938, attempts were made to replace the Kurrent script by the Sütterlin script, which was already in use in Germany. In 1941, Austria was also affected by the Reich-wide introduction of the "Deutsche Normalschrift".

Under a decree issued by the Federal Ministry of Education on 22 May 1951, the Kurrent script was reintroduced in Austrian schools, this time as a secondary script for "Schönschreiben" (calligraphic writing). By that time, the Kurrent script was rarely practised in daily life.

The "Lateinische Ausgangsschrift" (LA), which was introduced in the FRG in 1953, was also introduced in Austria's elementary schools in 1963 with largely identical letters. "P" and "R", however, were written in Austria in one go, i.e. with a loop running continuously upwards on the left. The "r" was continued after the stroke down to the baseline from there with a small right-turning loop (standing on the baseline) and was thus very similar to the previously used Kurrent script.

The "Österreichische Schulschrift" adopted in 1967/1970 largely followed the Austrian variant of the Lateinische Ausgangsschrift, simplifying the loop to a small arc and a second pointed reversal on the baseline. Around 1970, it was further simplified to a single pointed reversal – as already done in 1953 in the FRG.

In 1995 a new version of the "Österreichische Schulschrift" was adopted. It removed the loops inside the letters a, d, g, o and in many capital letters. The P and R are no longer written in one stroke, the X resembles the Antiqua-X and the numbers are more straightforward. Since the 1995/96 school year, teachers have had a free choice: during the writing course, either the new "Österreichische Schulschrift 1995" or the older "Österreichische Schulschrift 1969" can be used as the teaching script.

=== Switzerland ===
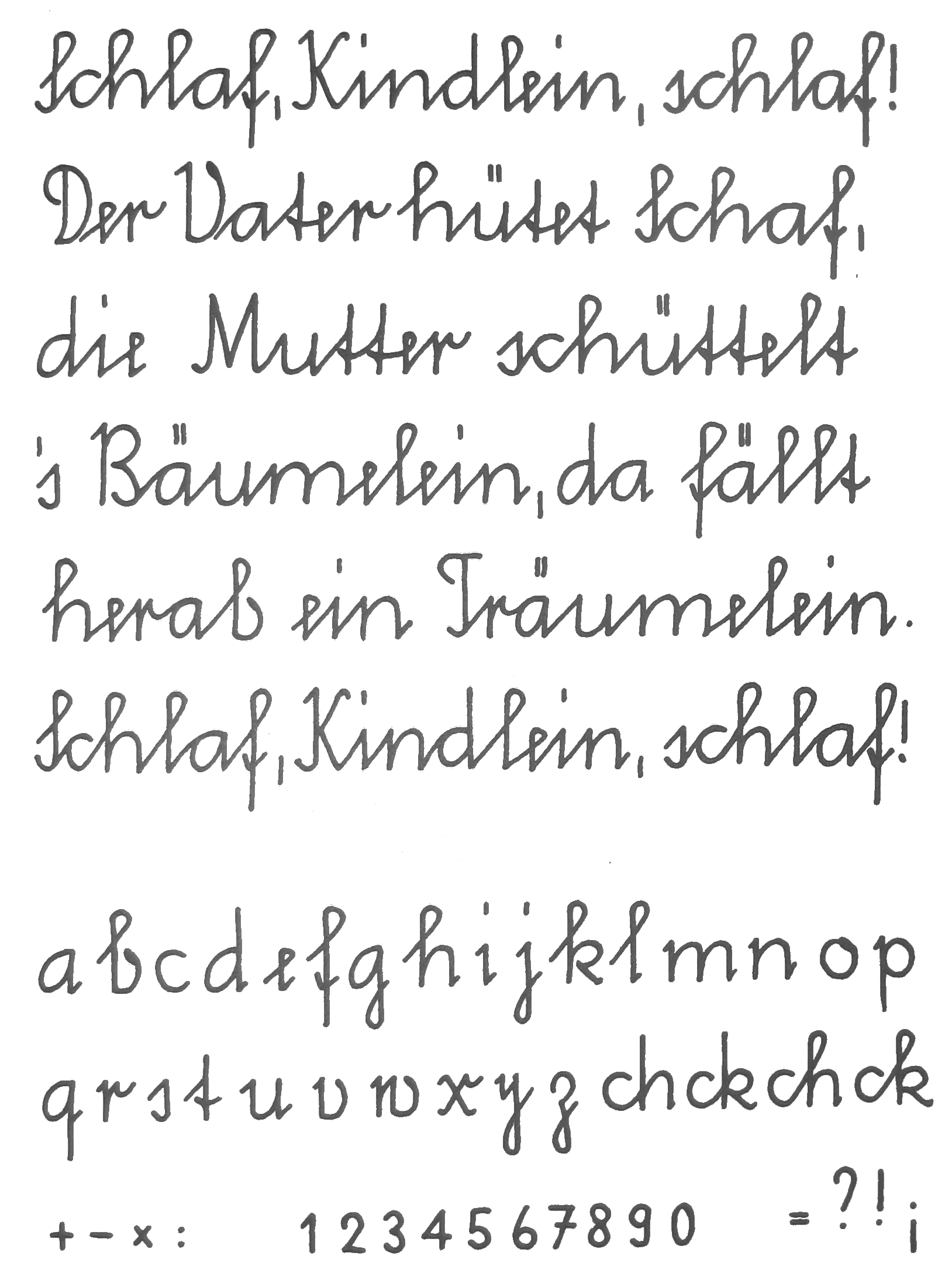
Schweizer Schulschrift (from 1947)

The currently taught Swiss Schulschrift (also known colloquially as "Schnürlischrift") was introduced in 1947.

In 2006, Hans Eduard Meier developed the no-frills Deutschschweizer Basisschrift, which is similar to the Deutsche Grundschrift, and proposed it as a contemporary alternative. In the canton of Lucerne, the Basisschrift has been approved as an alternative since 2006. Other cantons are waiting or are still discussing the use of the script. In 2008, a study by the Pädagogische Hochschule Zentralschweiz (University of Teacher Education Central Switzerland) showed that students who had learned to write with the Basisschrift were able to write more text in the same time than those who had learned the Schulschrift. In addition, the script was more legible and students more often agreed with the statement "I like writing".

== France ==
The French ronde script, a cursive script born in the late 16th century from an Italian Renaissance script, has been the traditional handwriting style in France for teaching, administration and financial documents, until the 20th century.

From 2013 onwards, for teaching purposes, the French Ministry of National Education recommends the modèles d'écriture scolaire A and B, which look more similar to printed scripts. These scripts were designed as part of a competition.

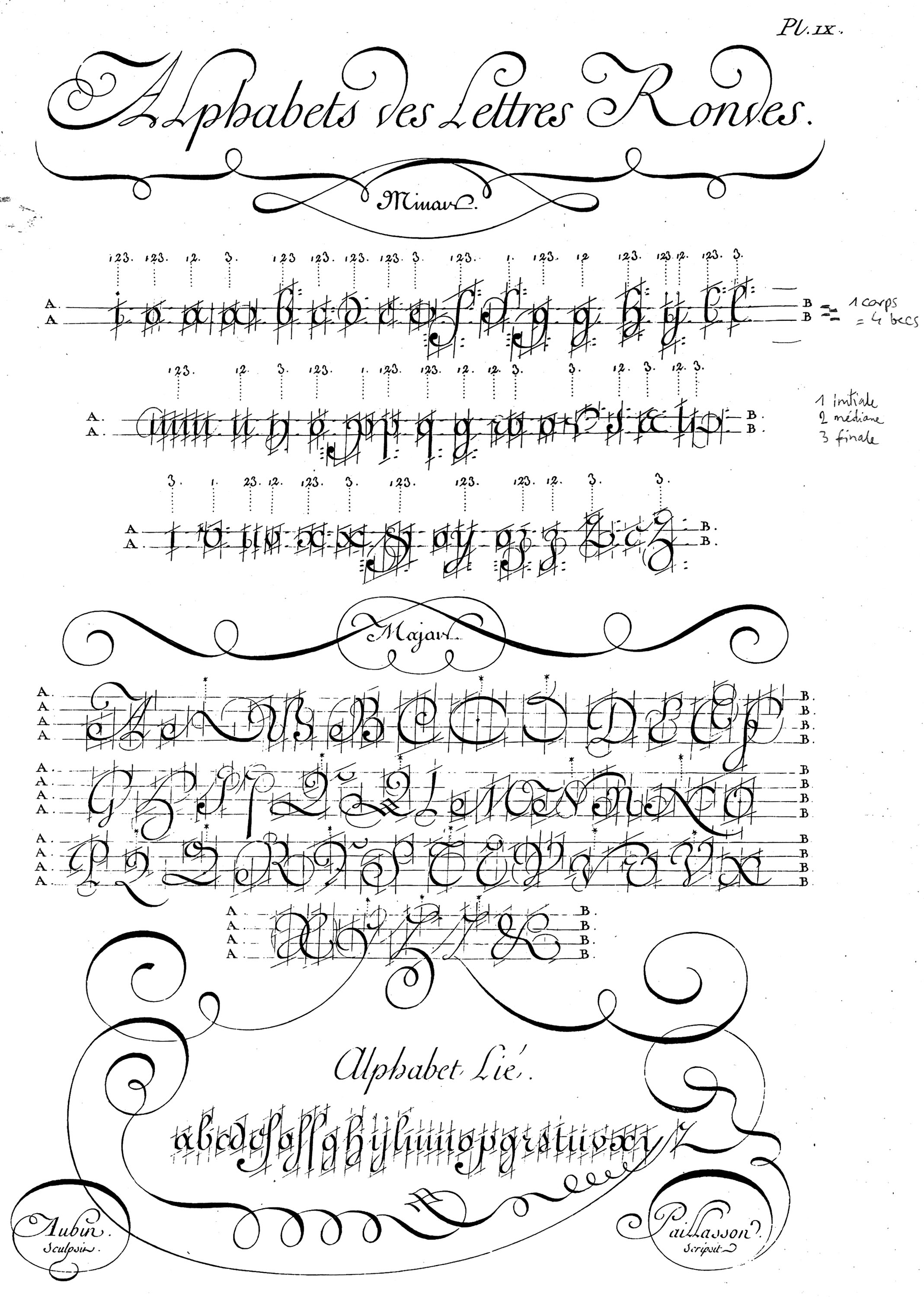
The French ronde script (taught until the 20th century)

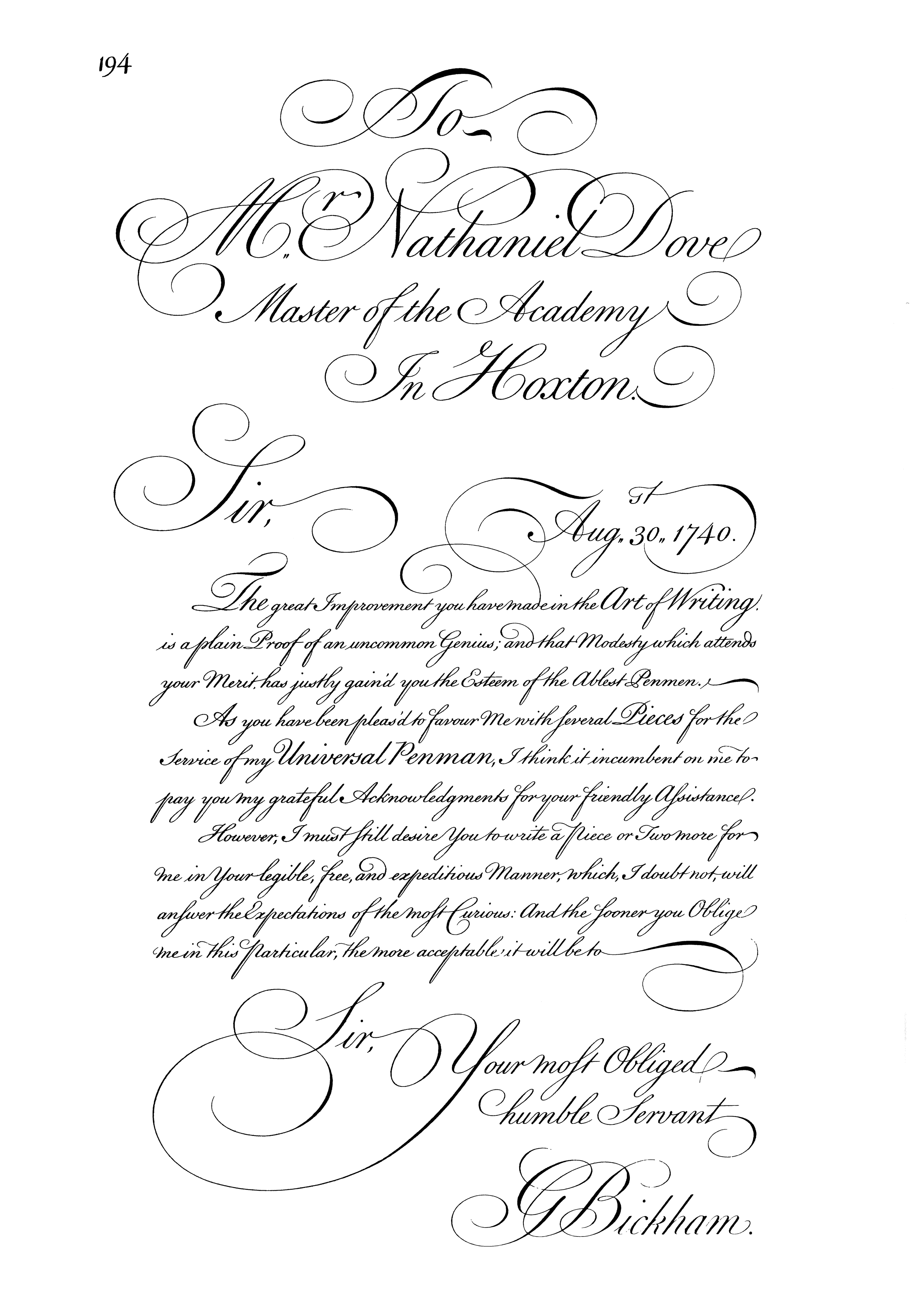
A sample (Note: This heavily decorated sample is not representative of the simpler style taught in French schools.) of the English roundhand (taught during the 20th and early 21st centuries)

France’s Modèle d’écriture scolaire A (from 2013)

France’s Modèle d’écriture scolaire B (from 2013)

== Denmark ==
In 1875 broken scripts were abolished and replaced by a looped cursive ("løkkeskrift"). In 1952, the Formskrift of the Norwegian Alvhild Bjerkenes was introduced to Denmark by the writing and grammar school teacher Christian Clemens Hansen and became the dominant script in schools over the next 20 to 30 years.

== Norway ==
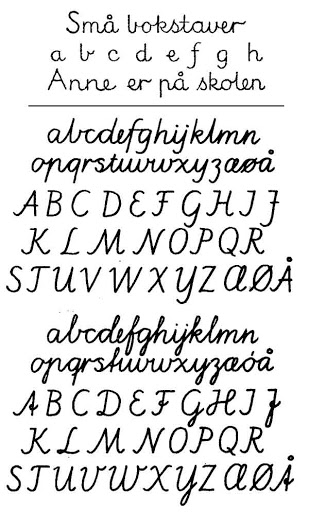
Formskrift (top), stavskrift (middle) and løkkeskrift (bottom)

Around 1850 broken and Kurrent scripts were abandoned in favour of Latin cursive scripts with loops. Until around 1970 cursive scripts with loops remained dominant in schools, although Alvhild Bjerkenes' formskrift and other cursive scripts without loops were introduced from the late 1940s onwards.

In 1979 Grunnskolerådet published standardized versions of trykkskrift (print), løkkeskrift, a cursive handwriting with loops, and stavskrift, a cursive handwriting without loops. Students are usually taught trykkskrift and either løkkeskrift or stavskrift.

== Sweden ==
Skolöverstyrelsestilen

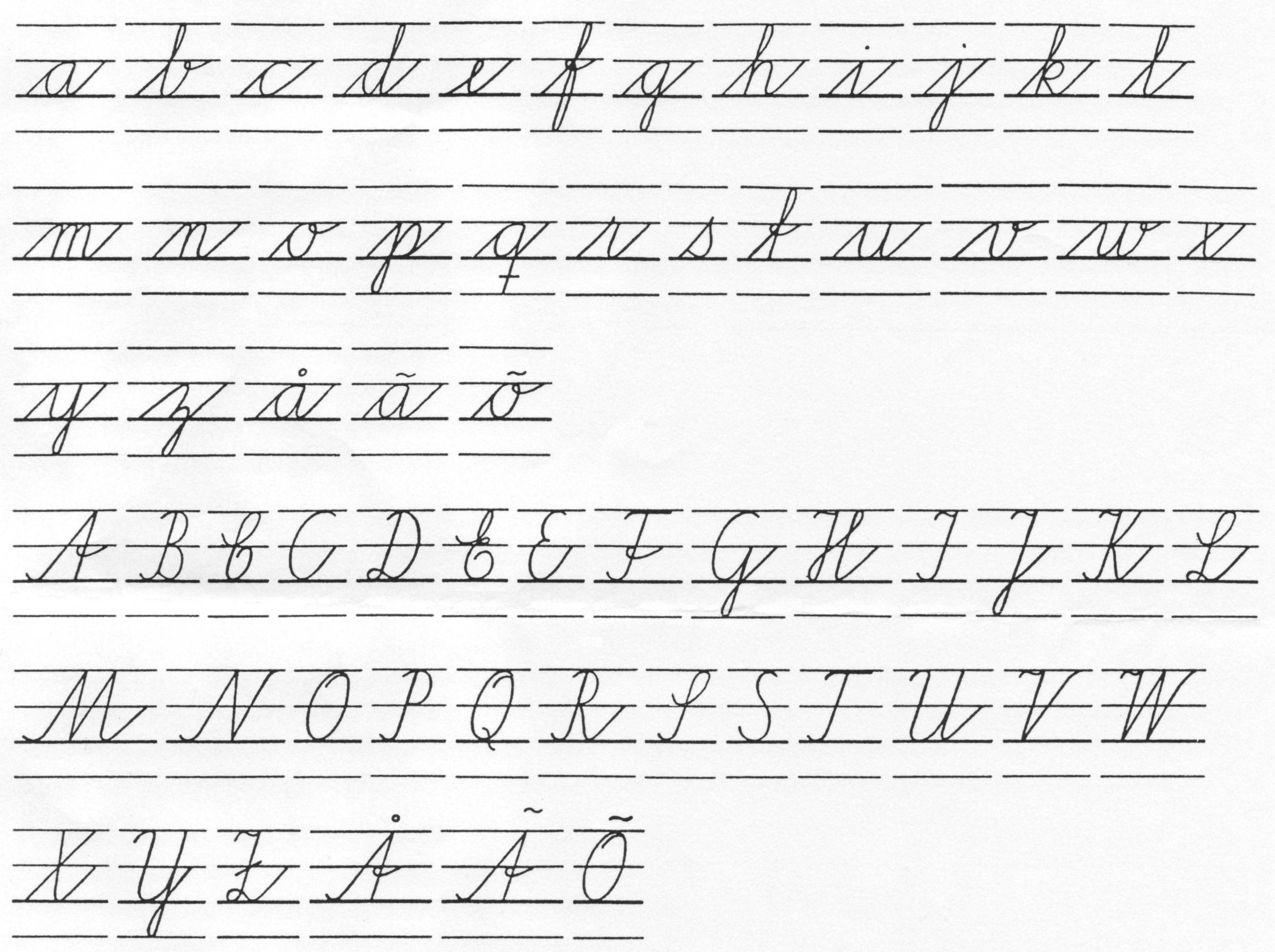
Swedish Skrivstil

In 1959, the school board (Skolöverstyrelsen, SÖ) had the possibility of introducing a uniform writing course examined. Until then there was no binding uniform method. The teaching scripts or textbooks used were Skrivkursen Tomten, Skrivkursen Runa, Min skrivbok, Normalskriften, Funktionell handstil, Stockholmsstilen and Skrivkursen Pennan. In 1975, after a period of research and experimentation, the board introduced the Skolöverstyrelsestilen (SÖ-stilen), which was designed by calligrapher Kerstin Anckers and based on Ludovico Vicentino degli Arrighi's chancery cursive. After heavy criticism, the binding nature of this school script was revoked ten years later and some resumed using older scripts.

== Development in English-speaking countries ==
=== United Kingdom ===
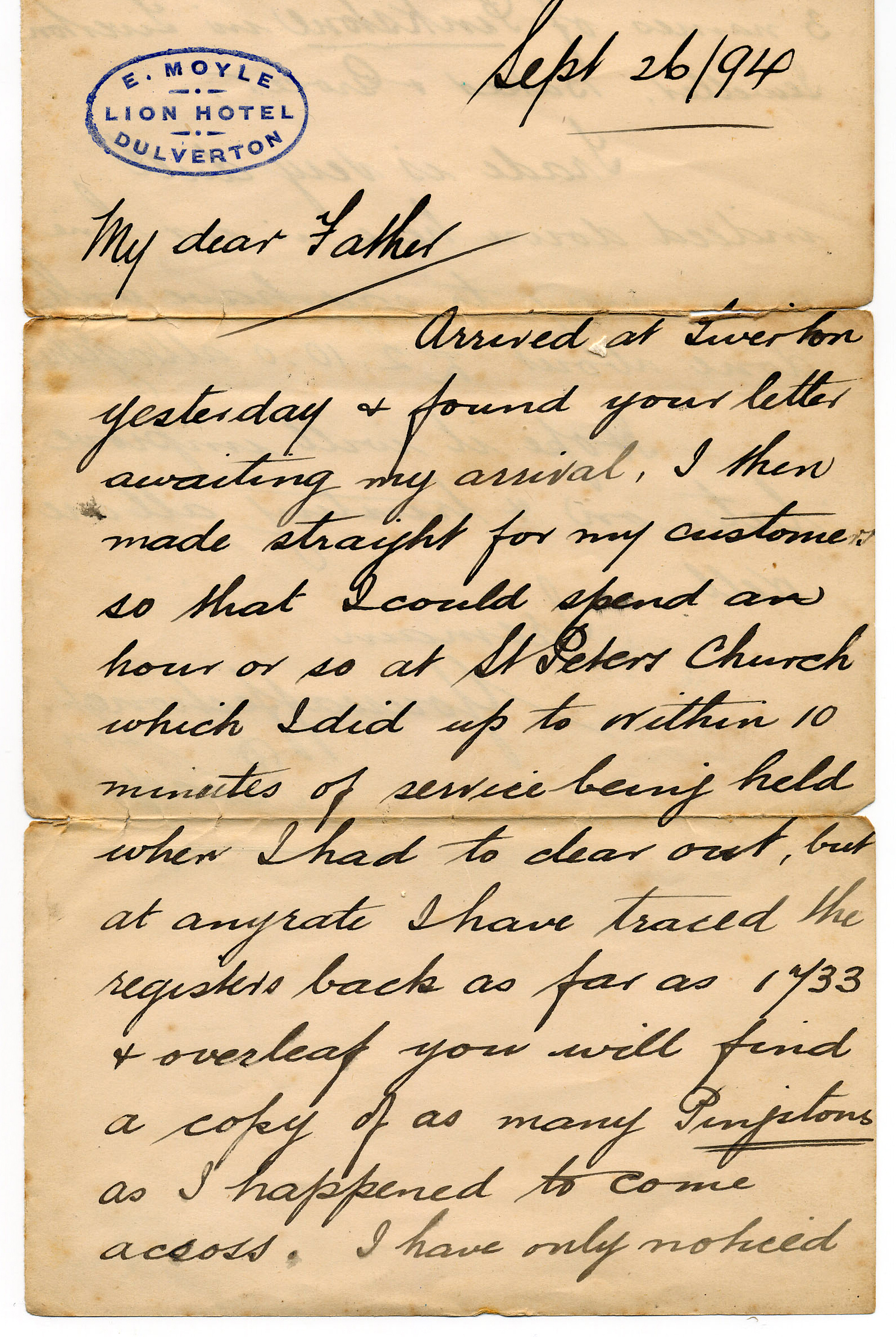
Continuous Cursive in an English letter from 1894

At the end of the 19th century, a widely used resource for handwriting teaching in British elementary schools was Henry Gordon's Handwriting and How to Teach it, originally published in the 1870s. This detailed how to develop handwriting from childish scribbles to a style based on the elaborate copperplate script. A simpler style, based on the ideas of the Arts and Crafts movement, was promoted by "Mrs Bridges" (Mary Monica Bridges), the wife of the poet Robert Bridges, which she published in A New Handwriting for Teachers (1899). However, the copperplate script continued to be taught in state-funded schools because it was required for clerks in commercial and professional offices. An important influence in the teaching of handwriting in the 20th century was Marion Richardson (1892-1946), a school inspector for the London County Council, who devised a simple cursive script intended to allow children to develop their own style. It was published in Writing and Writing Patterns (1935), which was widely used in British schools and remained in print until the 1980s.

Currently, there is no standardized teaching script stipulated in the various national curriculums for schools in the United Kingdom, only that one font style needs to be used consistently throughout the school. There are four teaching routes a school can choose from when teaching handwriting:

1. Use Print script as initial handwriting style, then progress to Cursive script, finally move to Continuous Cursive script.
2. Use Print script initially, then move to Continuous Cursive script.
3. Use Cursive script initially, then move to Continuous Cursive script.
4. Use Continuous Cursive script throughout all Key Stages.

Characteristics of Cursive and Continuous Cursive scripts:

	Cursive	Continuous Cursive
starting point for letters	variable	always on the writing line
finishing point for letters	always on the writing line (except for o, r, v and w, which have a top exit stroke)	always on the writing line (except for o, r, v and w, which have a top exit stroke)
single letter formation	letters taught with exit strokes only	letters taught with entry and exit strokes

In all handwriting styles, letters are created through joining lines and curve shapes in a particular way. Once pupils have learnt how to clearly form single letters, they are taught how single letters can be joined to form a flowing script. Whether Print, Cursive or Continuous Cursive is to be favoured as a teaching script remains a subject of debate in the United Kingdom. While many schools are opting to teach Continuous Cursive throughout the year groups, often starting in Reception, critics have argued that conjoined writing styles leave many children struggling with the high level of gross and fine motor coordination required.

=== United States ===
The Spencerian Method was the most important standardized handwriting system in the United States since the 1840s. Around 1888, the award-winning Palmer Method was developed as a simplification of Spencerian, which was supposed to be simpler and faster and soon became the most popular handwriting system. The corresponding Palmer's Guide to Business Writing from 1894 sold one million copies in the United States in 1912. The use of the method declined in the 1950s and it was eventually superseded by the Zaner-Bloser Method by 1976, which first taught block letters and then cursive in order to enable written expression as quickly as possible and thus develop the ability to write. In 1978 the D'Nealian Method was introduced which sought to alleviate the difficulties of the transition from block letters to cursive writing with the Zaner-Bloser method and returned to a more cursive style based on the Palmer script with block letters that have many similarities to cursive counterparts. Popular newer teaching scripts include Handwriting Without Tears and the Getty-Dubay cursive italic.

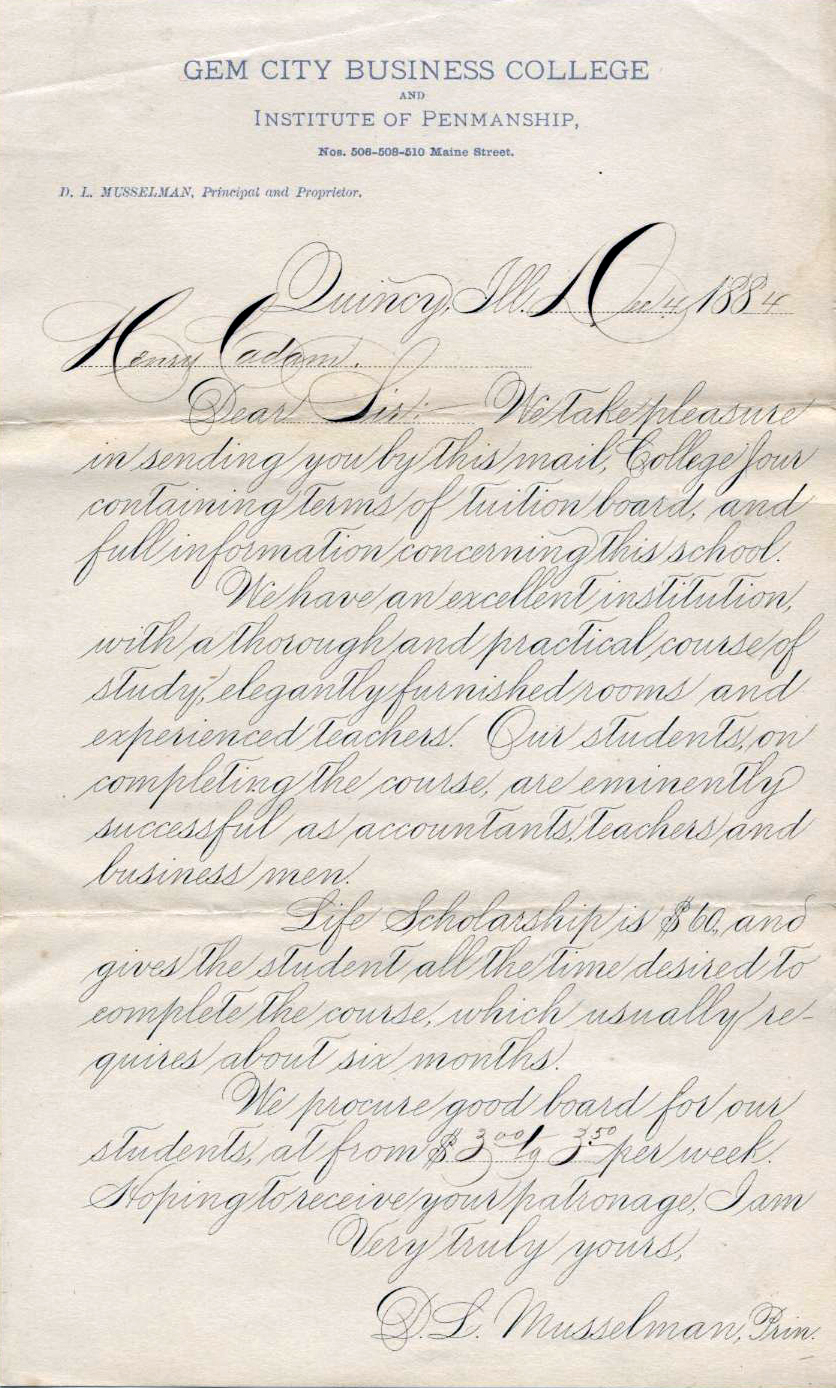
Spencerian script

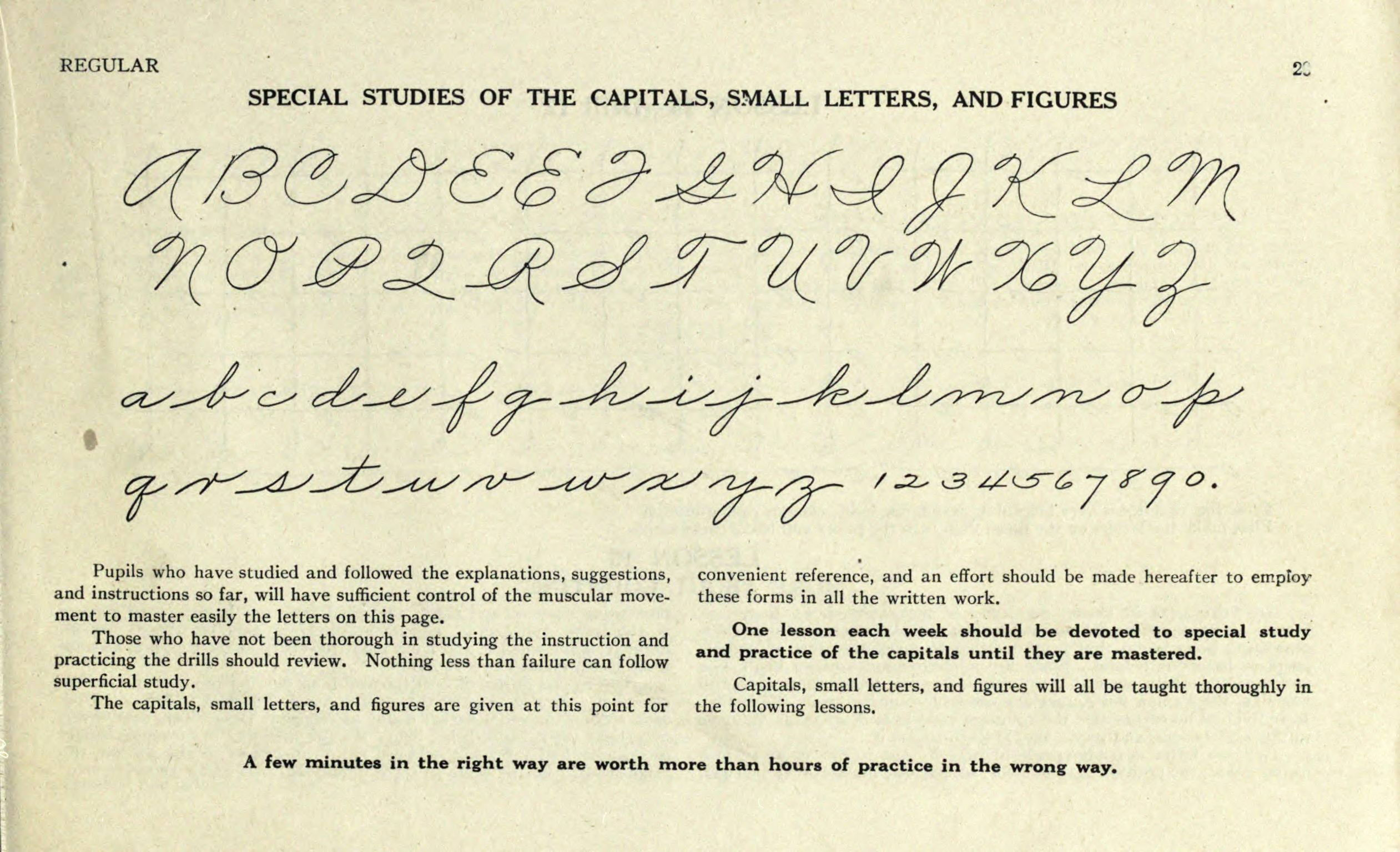
Palmer script

Zaner-Bloser script

D'Nealian script

Handwriting Without Tears

== Hong Kong ==
In Hong Kong, primary school children learn to write using the regular script. The character shapes to be taught are defined in the Hong Kong Chinese Lexical Lists for Primary Learning (香港小學學習字詞表), published by the Regional Government Office for Education in 2009.

== Japan ==
In Japan, textbook type (教科書体) is commonly used for education purpose. It is based on regular script but with specific emphasis on clarity of strokes.

Vietnamese cursive script according to Decision no. 31/2002/QĐ-BGDĐT

== Literature ==
- Erik Blumenthal: Schulschriften der verschiedenen Länder. Bern/Stuttgart 1957.
- Kurt Warwel: Schulausgangsschriften in deutschsprachigen Ländern. In: Spektrum der Wissenschaft 7, 1986.
- Mechthild Dehn: Die Kursiv als Ausgangsschrift. Ein Anstoß für Diskussion und Erprobung. In: Die Grundschulzeitschrift 69, 1993, pages 30, 35 and 36.
- Wilhelm Topsch: Das Ende einer Legende. Die vereinfachte Ausgangsschrift auf dem Prüfstand. Analyse empirischer Arbeiten zur vereinfachten Ausgangsschrift. Auer Verlag, Donauwörth 1996, ISBN 3-403-02855-0.
- Elisabeth Neuhaus-Siemon: Aspekte und Probleme des Schreibunterrichts. In: Hartmut Günther, Otto Ludwig (eds.): Schrift und Schriftlichkeit. Ein interdisziplinäres Handbuch internationaler Forschung. 2nd half volume, Berlin / New York 1996, ISBN 978-3-11-019413-5.
- Gabriele Faust-Siehl, Ariane Garlichs and others: Ausgangsschrift. In: Die Zukunft beginnt in der Grundschule. Arbeitskreis Grundschule. Rowohlt Taschenbuchverlag, Reinbek near Hamburg 1996, ISBN 978-3-499-60156-9.
- Wilhelm Topsch: Anfangsschriften. In: Grundkompetenz Schriftspracherwerb. Methoden und handlungsorientierte Praxisanregungen. 2. revised and extended edition. Beltz, Weinheim and others, 2005, ISBN 3-407-25368-0.
- Jürgen Hasert: Schulschriften. In: Didaktik der deutschen Sprache, volume 1. Schöningh, Paderborn 2006, ISBN 978-3-8252-8235-6.
- Wolfgang Menzel: Plädoyer für eine Schrift ohne normierte Verbindungen. In: Grundschule aktuell, number 110, May 2010, pages 23–25
