= German alphabet =

German form of the Latin alphabet

German alphabet
(Listen to a German speaker recite the alphabet in German)

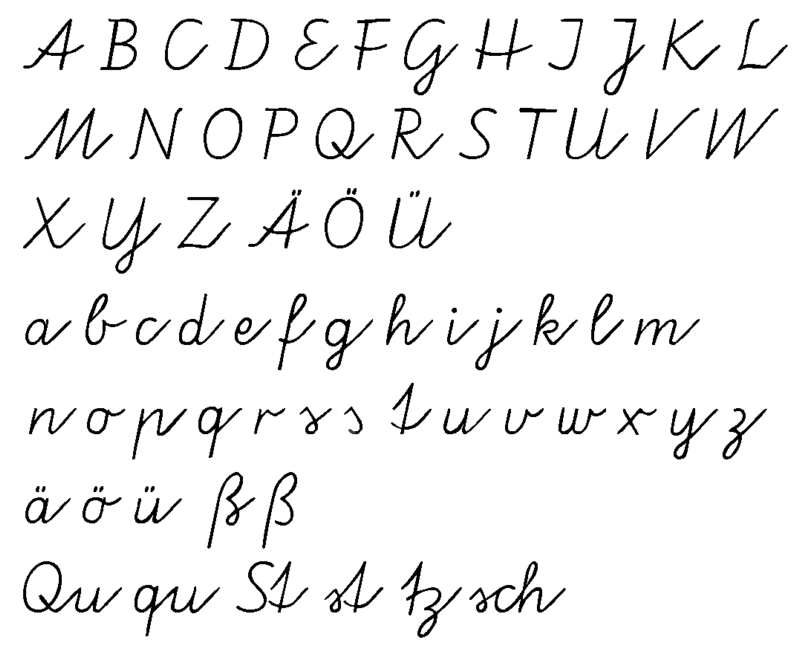

The modern German alphabet consists of the twenty-six letters of the ISO basic Latin alphabet plus four extra letters placed at the end:

Uppercase forms
A	B	C	D	E	F	G	H	I	J	K	L	M	N	O	P	Q	R	S	T	U	V	W	X	Y	Z	Ä	Ö	Ü	ẞ
Lowercase forms
a	b	c	d	e	f	g	h	i	j	k	l	m	n	o	p	q	r	s	t	u	v	w	x	y	z	ä	ö	ü	ß

German uses letter-diacritic combinations (Ä/ä, Ö/ö, Ü/ü) using the umlaut and one ligature (ẞ/ß (called eszett (sz) or scharfes S, sharp s)).

German extra letters
(Listen to a German speaker naming these letters)

Before 1940 German employed Fraktur, a blackletter typeface (see also Antiqua–Fraktur dispute), and Kurrent, various cursives that include the 20th-century Sütterlin. Grundschrift describes several current handwriting systems.

== Key characteristics ==
=== Umlaut diacritic usage ===
Although the diacritic letters represent distinct sounds in German phonology, they are almost universally not considered to be part of the alphabet. Almost all German speakers consider the alphabet to have the 26 cardinal letters above and will name only those when asked to say the alphabet.

The diacritic letters ä, ö and ü are used to indicate the presence of umlauts (frontalizations of back vowels). Before the introduction of the printing press, frontalization was indicated by placing an e after the back vowel to be modified, but German printers developed the space-saving typographical convention of replacing the full e with a small version placed above the vowel to be modified. In German Kurrent writing, the superscripted e was simplified to two vertical dashes, which have degenerated to dots in both handwriting and German typesetting. Although the two dots look like those in the diaeresis (trema) diacritical marking, a distinction should be made between umlaut and diaresis because the two have different functions.

When it is not possible to use the umlauts (for example, when using a restricted character set) the characters Ä, Ö, Ü, ä, ö, ü should be transcribed as Ae, Oe, Ue, ae, oe, ue respectively, following the earlier postvocalic-e convention; simply using the base vowel (e.g., u instead of ü) would be wrong and misleading. However, such transcription should be avoided if possible, especially with names. Names often exist in different variants, such as "Müller" and "Mueller", and with such transcriptions in use one could not work out the correct spelling of the name.

Automatic back-transcribing is not only wrong for names. Consider, for example, das neue Buch ("the new book"). This should never be changed to das neü Buch, as the second e is completely separate from the u: neue is neu (the root for new) followed by an e, an inflection. The word neü does not exist in German.

Furthermore, in northern and western Germany, there are family names and place names in which e lengthens the preceding vowel, as in the former Dutch orthography, such as Straelen, which is pronounced with a long a, not an ä. Similar cases are Soest, Coesfeld and Bernkastel-Kues.

In proper names and ethnonyms, there may also appear a rare ë and ï, which are not letters with an umlaut, but a diaeresis, used as in French to distinguish what could be a digraph, for example, ai in Karaïmen, eu in Alëuten, ie in Ferdinand Piëch and oe in Bernhard Hoëcker (although Hoëcker added the diaeresis personally). To separate the au diphthong, as well as some others, which are graphically composed of potentially umlaut-holding letters, the acute accent is sometimes used (e.g. Saúdi-Arabien).

Swiss typewriters and computer keyboards do not allow easy input of uppercase letters with umlauts (nor ß) for their positions are taken by the most frequent French diacritics. Uppercase umlauts were dropped because they are less common than lowercase ones (especially in Switzerland). Geographical names in particular are supposed to be written with A, O, U plus e except "Österreich" (Austria). The omission can cause some inconvenience since the first letter of every noun is capitalized in German.

Unlike in Hungarian, the exact shape of the umlaut diacritics, especially when handwritten, is not important, because they are the only ones in the language (except for the dot on i and j). They will be understood whether they look like dots (¨), acute accents (̋), vertical bars (̎), a horizontal bar (macron, ¯), a breve (˘), a tiny N, a tilde (˜), and such variations are often used in stylized writing (e.g. logos). In the past, however, the breve was traditionally used in some scripts to distinguish a u from an n, as was the ring (°). In rare cases the n was underlined. The breved u was common in some Kurrent-derived handwritings; it was mandatory in Sütterlin.

=== Sharp s ===
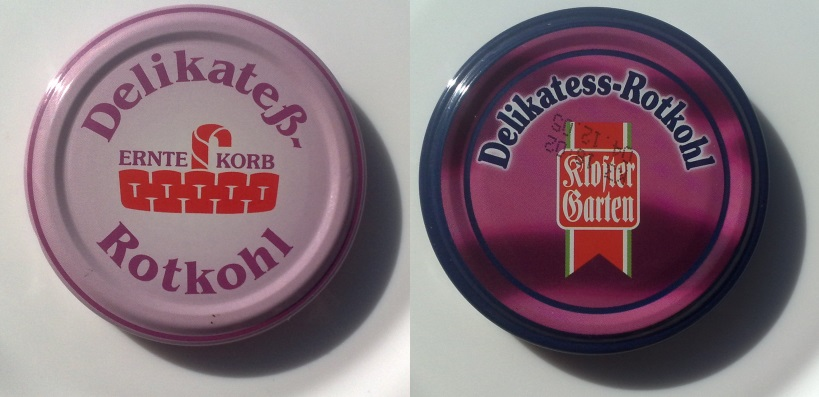
The German sign "Delicious red cabbage." Left cap is with old orthography, right with new.

The eszett or scharfes S (ß) represents the unvoiced s sound. The German spelling reform of 1996 somewhat reduced usage of this letter in Germany and Austria. It is not used in Switzerland and Liechtenstein.

As the ß derives from a ligature of lower-case letters, it is itself lower-case. The proper transcription when it cannot be used is ss. When writing a word in all capital letters, capital ẞ must be used, or, if it is unavailbale, SS. This transcription can give rise to ambiguities, albeit rarely; one such case is in Maßen (in moderation) vs. in Massen (en masse). For all caps usage, an uppercase ß has been proposed for over a century, and was officially adopted in 2017. In 2008, it was included in Unicode 5.1 as U+1E9E, and since 2010 its use is mandatory in official documentation when writing geographical names in all-caps.

Although nowadays substituted correctly only by ss, the letter actually originates from two distinct ligatures (depending on word and spelling rules): long s with round s ("ſs") and long s with (round) z ("ſz"/"ſʒ"). Some people therefore prefer to substitute "ß" by "sz". According to official rules this is incorrect, but it can avoid possible ambiguities (as in the above "Maßen" vs "Massen" example).

Incorrect use of the "ß" letter is a very common type of spelling error even among native German speakers. Although the spelling reform of 1996 was meant to simplify the rules concerning "ß" and "ss", it also caused considerable confusion and is widely disregarded: some people even incorrectly assumed that the "ß" had been abolished completely.

=== Long s ===
In the Fraktur typeface and similar scripts, a long s (ſ) was used except in syllable endings (cf. Greek sigma) and sometimes it was historically used in antiqua fonts as well; but it went out of general use in the early 1940s along with the Fraktur typeface. An example where this convention would avoid ambiguity is Wachstube, which was written either Wachſtube = Wach-Stube (German pronunciation: [ˈvax.ʃtuːbə], guardhouse) or Wachstube = Wachs-Tube (German pronunciation: [vaks.tuːbə], tube of wax).

=== Letter usage in loanwords ===
- Except for the common sequences sch (/ʃ/), ch (allophone: /x/ or /ç/) and ck (/k/) the letter c appears only in loanwords or in proper nouns. In many loanwords, including most words of Latin origin, the letter c pronounced (/k/) has been replaced by k. German words which come from Latin words with c before e, i, y, ae, oe are usually pronounced with (/ts/) and spelled with z.
- The letter q in German only ever appears in the sequence qu (/kv/), with the exception of loanwords, e.g., Coq au vin or Qigong (which is also written Chigong).
- The letter x (Ix, /ɪks/) occurs almost exclusively in loanwords. Native German words that are now pronounced with a /ks/ sound are usually written using chs or cks, as with Fuchs (fox). Some exceptions do occur, though, such as Hexe (witch), Nixe (mermaid) and Axt (axe).
- The letter y (Ypsilon, /ˈʏpsilɔn/) occurs almost exclusively in loanwords, especially words of Greek origin, although some such words (e.g., Typ) have become so common that they are no longer perceived as foreign. It used to be more common in German orthography in earlier centuries, and traces of this earlier usage persist in proper names. It is used either as an alternative letter for i, for instance in Mayer / Meyer (a common family name that occurs also in the spellings Maier / Meier), or – especially in the Southwest – as a representation of [iː] that goes back to an old ⟨IJ⟩, for instance in Schwyz or Schnyder (an Alemannic German variant of the name Schneider). Another notable exception is Bayern, the German name of Bavaria, and derived words like bayerisch (Bavarian).

In loan words from the French language spelling and accents are usually preserved. For instance, café is always written Café in German when it means "coffeehouse"; Cafe would be considered erroneous and it cannot be written Kaffee either, because this means coffee. For this reason German typewriters and computer keyboards offer two dead keys, one for the acute and grave accents, and one for circumflex. Other letters occur less often, like ç in loan words from French or Portuguese, and ñ in loan words from Spanish.

=== Sorting ===
There are three ways to deal with the umlauts in alphabetic sorting.

1. Treat them like their base characters, as if the umlaut was not present (DIN 5007-1, section 6.1.1.4.1). This is the preferred method for dictionaries, where umlauted words ("Füße", feet) should appear near their origin words ("Fuß", foot). In words which are the same except for one having an umlaut and one its base character (e.g., "Müll" vs. "Mull"), the word with the base character gets precedence.
2. Decompose them (invisibly) to vowel plus e (DIN 5007-2, section 6.1.1.4.2). This is often preferred for personal and geographical names, wherein the characters are used unsystematically, as in German telephone directories ("Müller, A.; Mueller, B.; Müller, C.").
3. They are treated like extra letters either placed
  1. after their base letters (Austrian phone books have ä between az and b etc.) or
  2. at the end of the alphabet (as in Swedish or in extended ASCII).

Microsoft Windows in German versions offers the choice between the first two variants in its internationalisation settings.

Eszett is sorted as though it were ss. Occasionally it is treated as s, but this is generally considered incorrect. It is not used at all in Switzerland.

Accents in French loan words are always ignored in collation.

In rare contexts (e. g. in older indices) sch (equal to English sh) and likewise st and ch are treated as single letters, but the vocalic digraphs ai, ei (historically ay, ey), au, äu, eu and the historic ui and oi never are.

== Letter names ==
- A: /aː/
- Ä: /ɛː/ or Umlaut A
- B: /beː/
- C: /t͡seː/
- D: /deː/
- E: /eː/
- F: /ɛf/
- G: /ɡeː/
- H: /haː/
- I: /iː/
- J: /jɔt/; in Austria also /jeː/
- K: /kaː/
- L: /ɛl/
- M: /ɛm/
- N: /ɛn/
- O: /oː/
- Ö: /øː/ or Umlaut O
- P: /peː/
- Q: /kuː/; in Austria also /kveː/
- R: /ɛʁ/ (usually [ʔɛɐ̯] when stressed, sometimes bare [ɐ] when unstressed, e.g. in NRW)
- S: /ɛs/
- ß: Eszett, /ɛsˈt͡sɛt/; scharfes S, /ˈʃaʁfəsˌɛs/
- T: /teː/
- U: /uː/
- Ü: /yː/ or Umlaut U
- V: /faʊ̯/
- W: /veː/
- X: /ɪks/
- Y: /ˈʏpsilɔn/
- Z: /t͡sɛt/

== Spelling alphabet ==
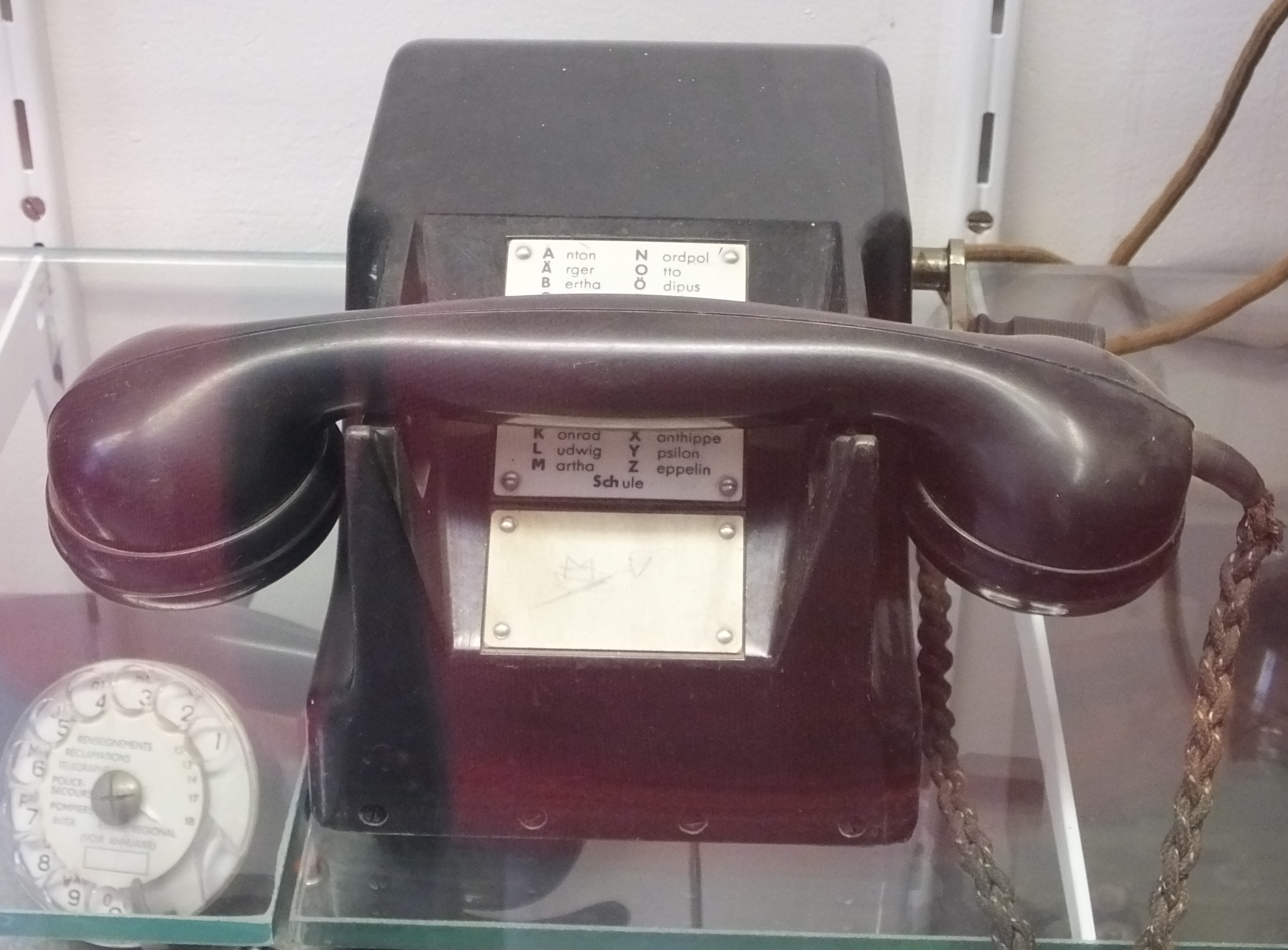
Vintage telephone at the museum in Saint-Jean-du-Gard with the German spelling alphabet on a plaque. This is another variant alphabet, with Konrad for K and Ödipus used for Ö.

There is a German spelling alphabet similar to the ICAO spelling alphabet. The version in Germany in the late 20th century and early 21st century was:

Letter	Code	Letter	Code	Letter	Code
A	Anton	K	Kaufmann	ß	Eszett
Ä	Ärger [anger]	L	Ludwig	T	Theodor
B	Berta	M	Martha	U	Ulrich
C	Cäsar	N	Nordpol	Ü	Übermut [high spirits]
D	Dora	O	Otto	V	Viktor
E	Emil	Ö	Ökonom [economist]	W	Wilhelm
F	Friedrich	P	Paula	X	Xanthippe
G	Gustav	Q	Quelle [source]	Y	Ypsilon
H	Heinrich	R	Richard	Z	Zacharias
I	Ida	S	Samuel		
J	Julius	SCH	SCHule [school]		

The spelling alphabet was changed several times during the 20th century, in some cases for political reasons. In 1934, "Jewish" names (i.e. those derived from the Hebrew Bible) were replaced by the Nazi regime. Thus, David, Jakob, Nathan, Samuel and Zacharias became Dora, Jot, Nordpol, Siegfried and Zeppelin. In Germany, the 1948 and 1950 versions reverted to some of the old versions but introduced additional changes. Many of the older, officially obsolete forms are still found in popular use, in particular Siegfried and Zeppelin. Some letter names are still official in Austria. The official Austrian version, as laid down in ÖNORM A 1081, differs from DIN 5009 in the following places:

Letter	Code	Letter	Code
K	Konrad	Ü	Übel [evil]
Ö	Österreich	X	Xaver
S	Siegfried	Z	Zürich
ß	Scharfes S		

Konrad is also used in Germany, although this is not and never was official there. Konrad can cause confusion since the first name "Conrad" (spelled with a "C") also exists. Not following the norm, but not uncommon are CHarlotte and - especially in Austria - CHristine, Norbert and Zeppelin.

In Switzerland and Liechtenstein another different spelling alphabet is used, with Anna, Äsch, Chiasso, Daniel, Jakob, Kaiser, Leopold, Marie, Niklaus, Örlikon, Peter, Quasi ('as if', 'so to speak'), Sophie, Yverdon, Zürich replacing the usual German words.

In 2022, a large-scale revision of the DIN 5009 spelling alphabet was formalized, removing all personal names and favoring city names instead.

== See also ==
- German orthography
- German braille
