= Grundschrift =

Type of teaching cursive

Latin script (Sütterlin subvariant)
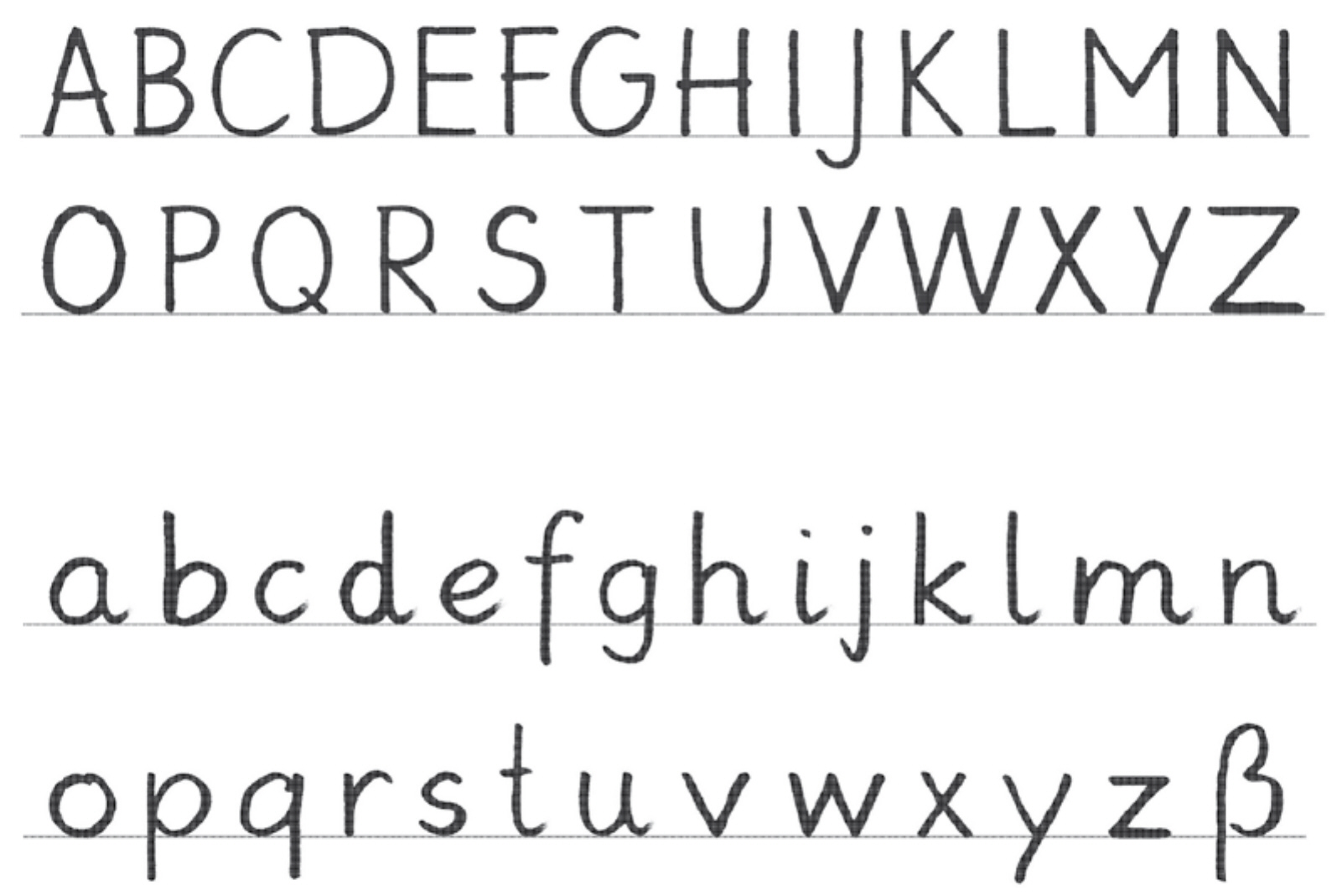
- Hamburg's block letters.
- Script type: Alphabet
- Period: –
- Languages: German

ISO 15924
- ISO 15924: Latf (217), Latin (Fraktur variant)

Grundschrift (basic handwriting, literally ground script) is a simplified form of handwriting adopted by Hamburg schools as a Teaching script, and it is currently endorsed by the German National Primary Schoolteachers' Union.

If nationally adopted, it would replace the three different German cursives currently being taught in schools: the Lateinische Ausgangsschrift (introduced in 1953), the Schulausgangsschrift (1968), and the Vereinfachte Ausgangsschrift (1969), providing a standardized system of handwriting in German school systems.

Grundschrift letters are written separately as block letters as opposed to cursive script, in which letters are conjoined together in a flowing motion. As a teaching script, Grundschrift is meant to provide a common foundation for the emergence of each child's idiosyncratic script, whether that be block, cursive, or otherwise.

== See also ==
- Kurrent
- Sütterlin
