= Ludwig Sütterlin =

German graphic artist (1865–1917)

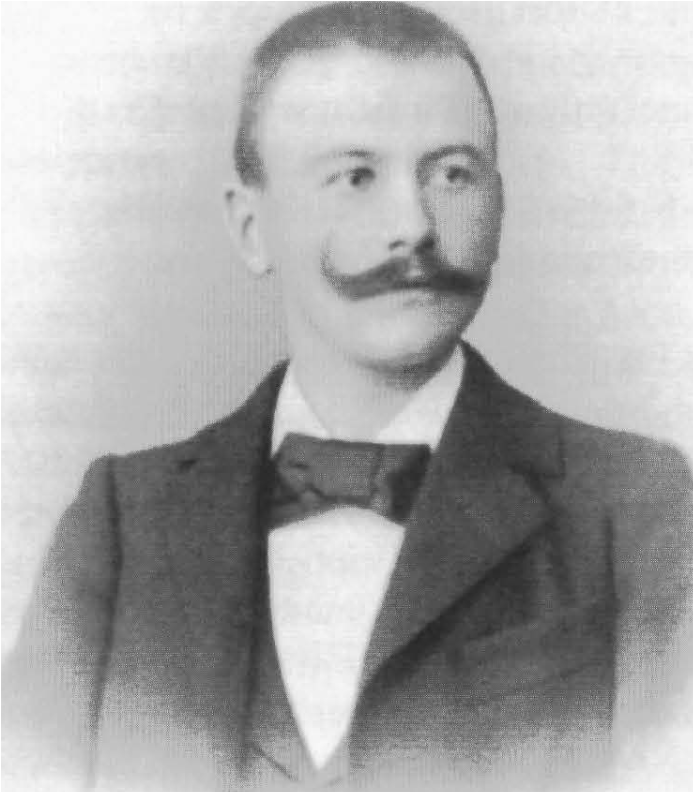
- Born: July 23, 1865; Lahr, Grand Duchy of Baden
- Died: November 20, 1917 (aged 52); Berlin, Germany
- Occupation: Graphic Artist

Ludwig Sütterlin (July 23, 1865 – November 20, 1917) was a graphic artist who lived in Berlin, Germany, and was most notable for designing and creating the old German blackletter handwriting Sütterlinschrift (Sütterlin script) or simply Sütterlin.

Ludwig was born on July 23, 1865, in Lahr, located within the Schwarzwald (Black Forest). Although Sütterlin's childhood is currently unknown, the most notable years of his life began when he moved to Berlin and began his profession as a graphic artist—gaining fame for a poster submitted to the Industrial Exhibition in Berlin, Germany, 1896. Later, Sütterlin worked as a teacher at the "Teaching Institution of the Royal Museum of Decorative Arts" in Berlin, and the future "United State Schools for Free and Applied Arts," where he held courses in artistic fonts.

In 1911, Sütterlin was tasked by the Royal Prussian Ministry of Culture to create courses for preschool and school. This connection to the education system could possibly have led him to his future ambition to create a national script for Germany.

At the time, the current writing style was based on alternating pressure, which made it difficult for primary school pupils to hurdle the writing exercises, leading Ludwig to develop a child-oriented methodology for writing beginners: making the line width uniform, all letters vertical and geometrically straight or circular. This new and more simple writing allowed all students, artistically inclined or not, to be able to write the script. In 1914, the initial trials of using Sütterlin in Berlin schools began and ultimately was declared Berlin's national script for education by Prussia in 1924. Most other German states (i.g., Oldenburg, Thuringia, Hesse, and Baden) followed the example of Prussia, so that from about 1930 Germany mainly introduced Sütterlin for education. Unfortunately for Sütterlin, he was not able to see his work come to fruition, for he died 7 years before in Berlin on November 20, 1917.
