= Kurrent =

Form of German-language handwriting

- Alphabet in Kurrent script from about 1865. The next-to-last line shows the umlauts ⟨ä⟩, ⟨ö⟩, ⟨ü⟩, and the corresponding capital letters ⟨Ae⟩, ⟨Oe⟩, and ⟨Ue⟩; and the last line shows the ligatures ⟨ch⟩, ⟨ck⟩, ⟨th⟩, ⟨sch⟩, ⟨sz⟩ (⟨ß⟩), and ⟨st⟩.
- Script type: Alphabet
- Period: –
- Direction: Left-to-right
- Languages: German, Danish, Swedish, Norwegian, Icelandic

ISO 15924
- ISO 15924: Latf (217), Latin (Fraktur variant)

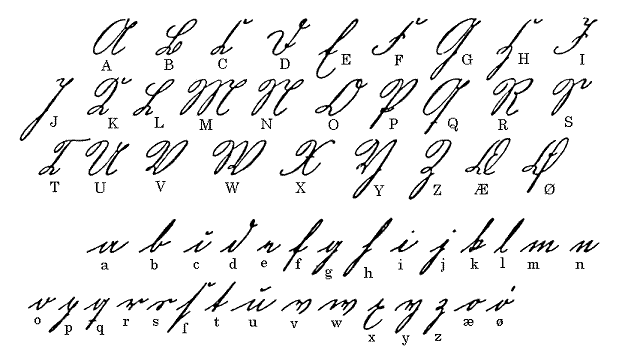
Danish Kurrent script (»gotisk skrift«) from about 1800 with ⟨Æ⟩ and ⟨Ø⟩ at the end of the alphabet.

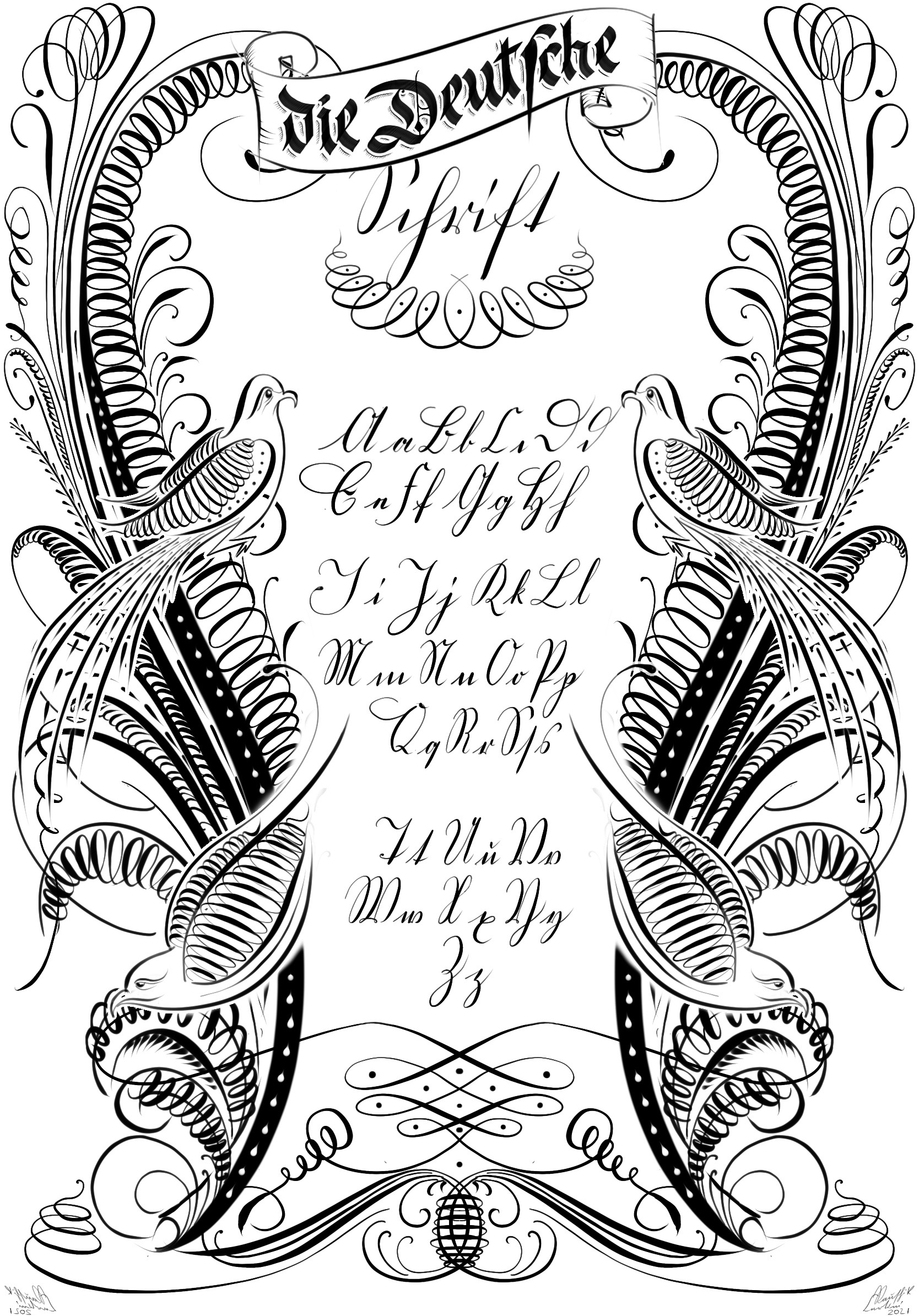
Sample font table of German handwriting by Kaushik Carlini, 2021.

Kurrent (German: [kʊˈʁɛnt]), also known as Kurrentschrift ("cursive script"), deutsche Schrift ("German script"), and German cursive, is an old form of hand used for writing the German language, and during the 19th century also the Nordic languages. Evolving out of late medieval cursive writing, many individual letters acquired variant forms over the long history of its use into the first part of the 20th century.

Similarly to Antiqua and Fraktur, German writers used both cursive styles — Kurrent and "Latin" cursive — concomitantly: location, contents, and context of the text determined which script style to use, and it was accordingly normal to switch between the two within a sentence. For instance, a term in French or a French toponym would be written in "Latin" cursive, surrounded by Kurrent.

Sütterlin is a modern script based on Kurrent that is characterized by simplified letters and vertical strokes. It was developed in 1911 and taught in all German schools as the primary script from 1915 until the beginning of January 1941, when it was replaced with deutsche Normalschrift ("normal German handwriting"), sometimes called "Latin writing".

== Lettering examples ==
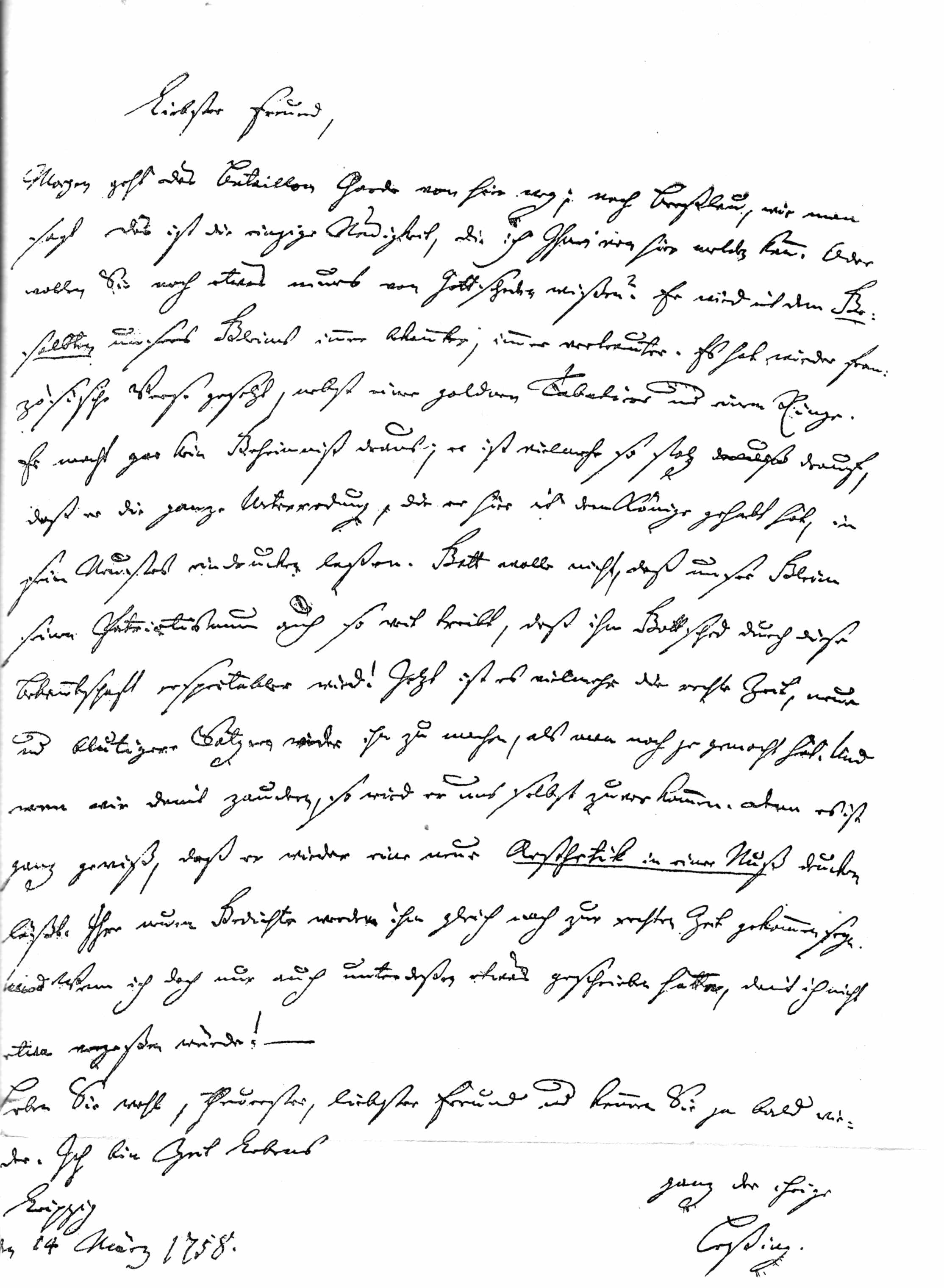
Letter from Lessing to Kleist, 14 March 1758

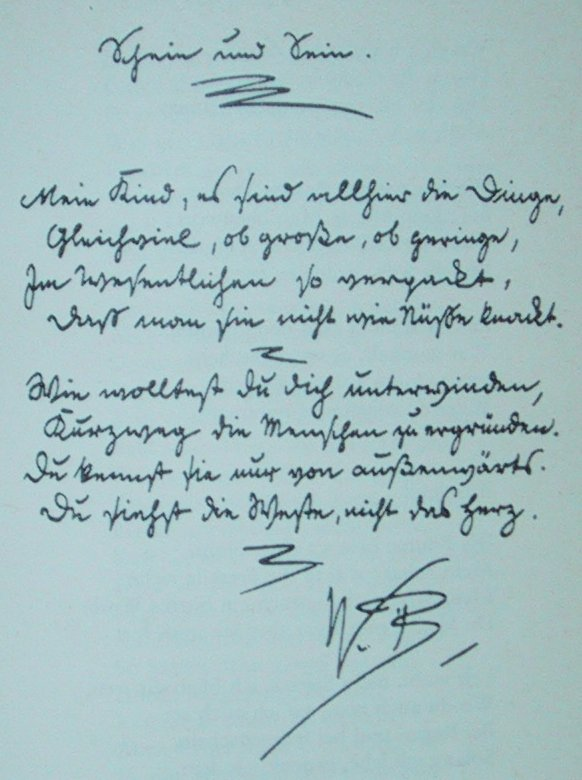
Manuscript by Wilhelm Busch (undated, late 19th century)

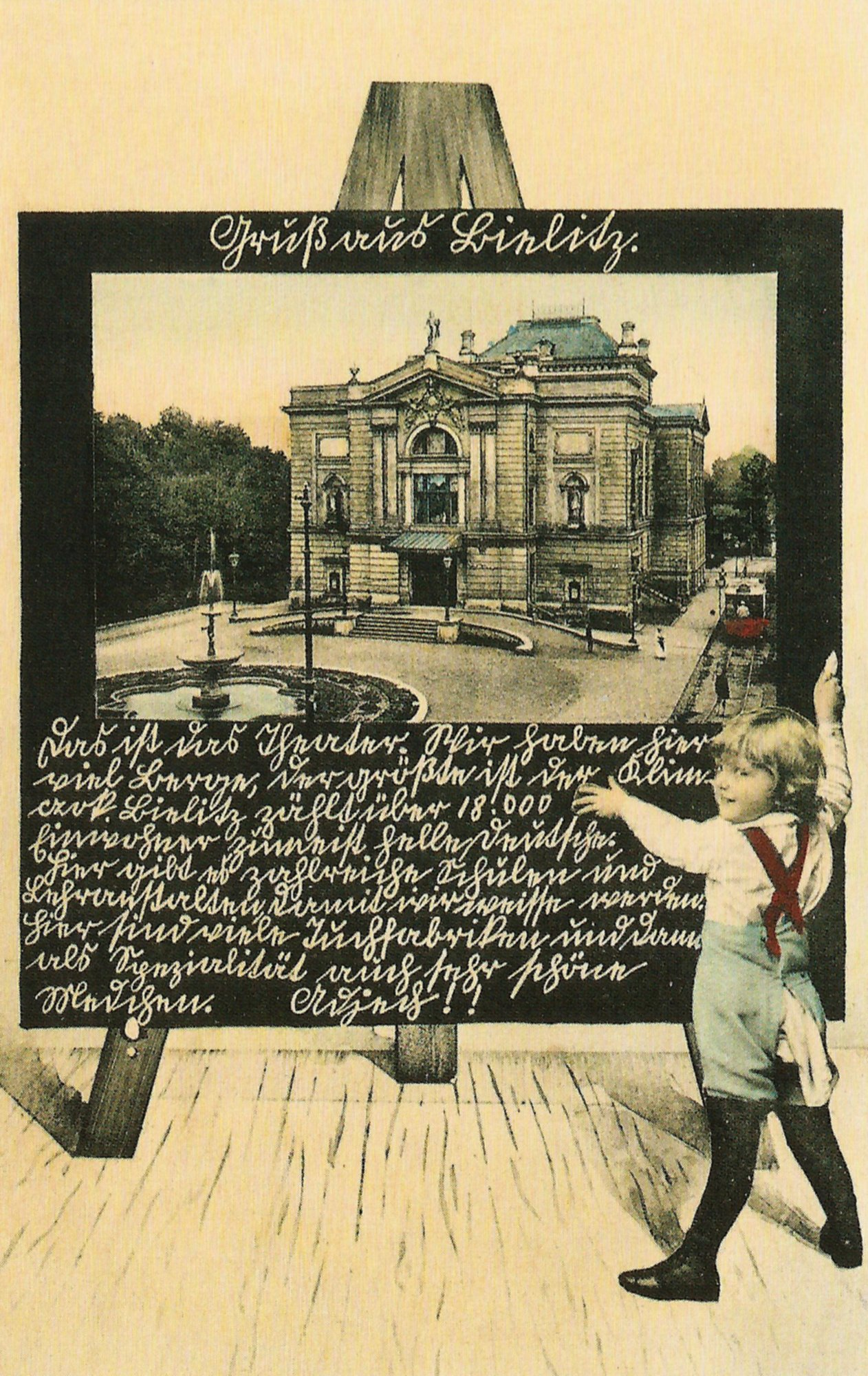
Example from a book published in 1905

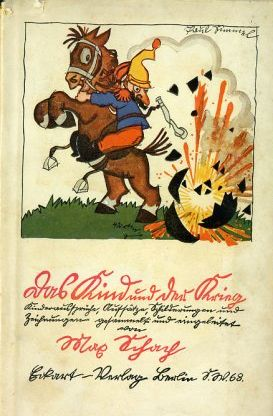
Kurrent script used for text in a 1916 children's book

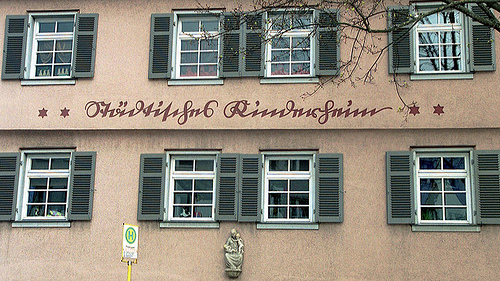
Signage on a municipal children's home (Städtisches Kinderheim) in Esslingen am Neckar in 2006

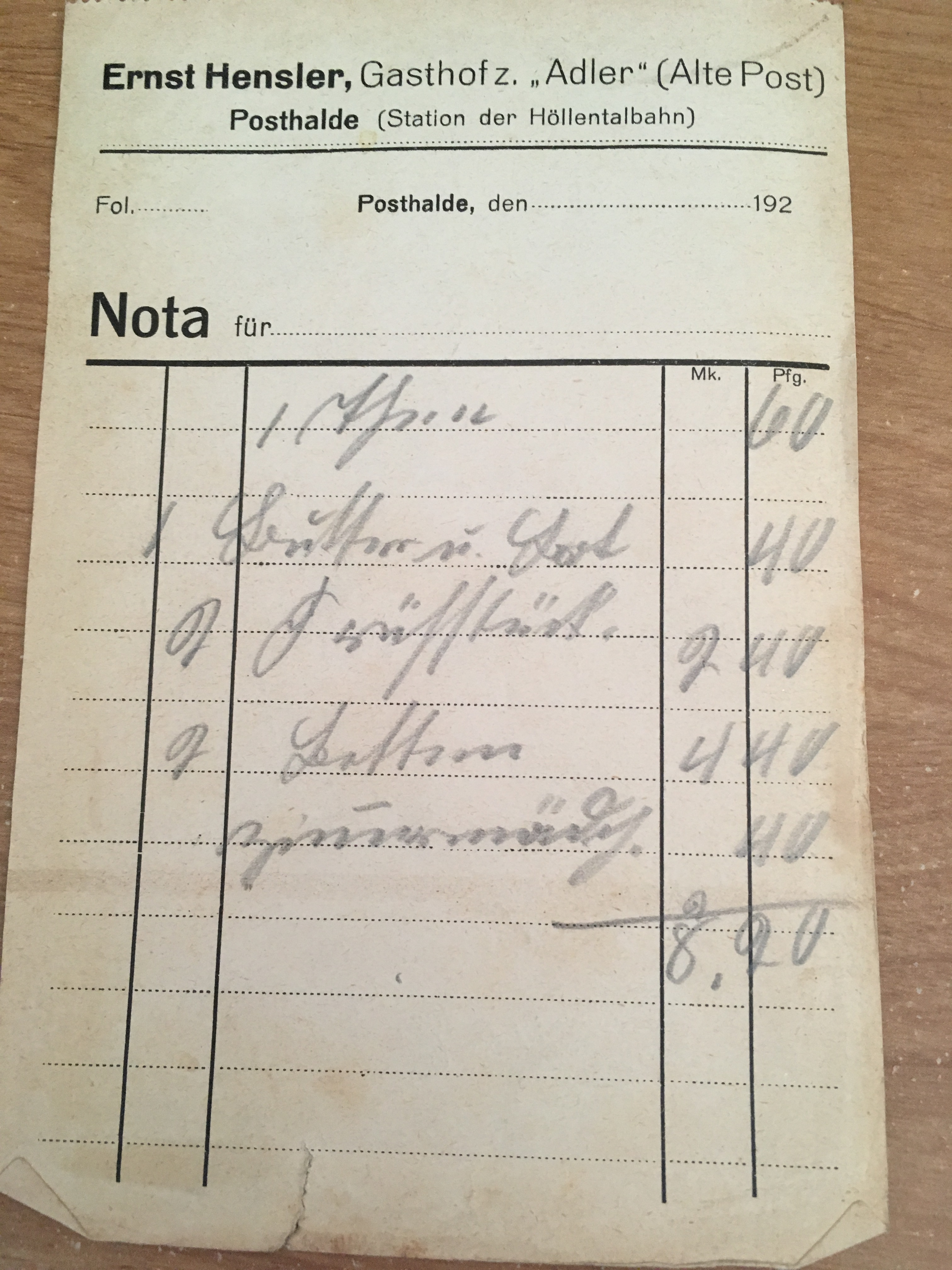
A handwritten restaurant order in Kurrent from the 1920s

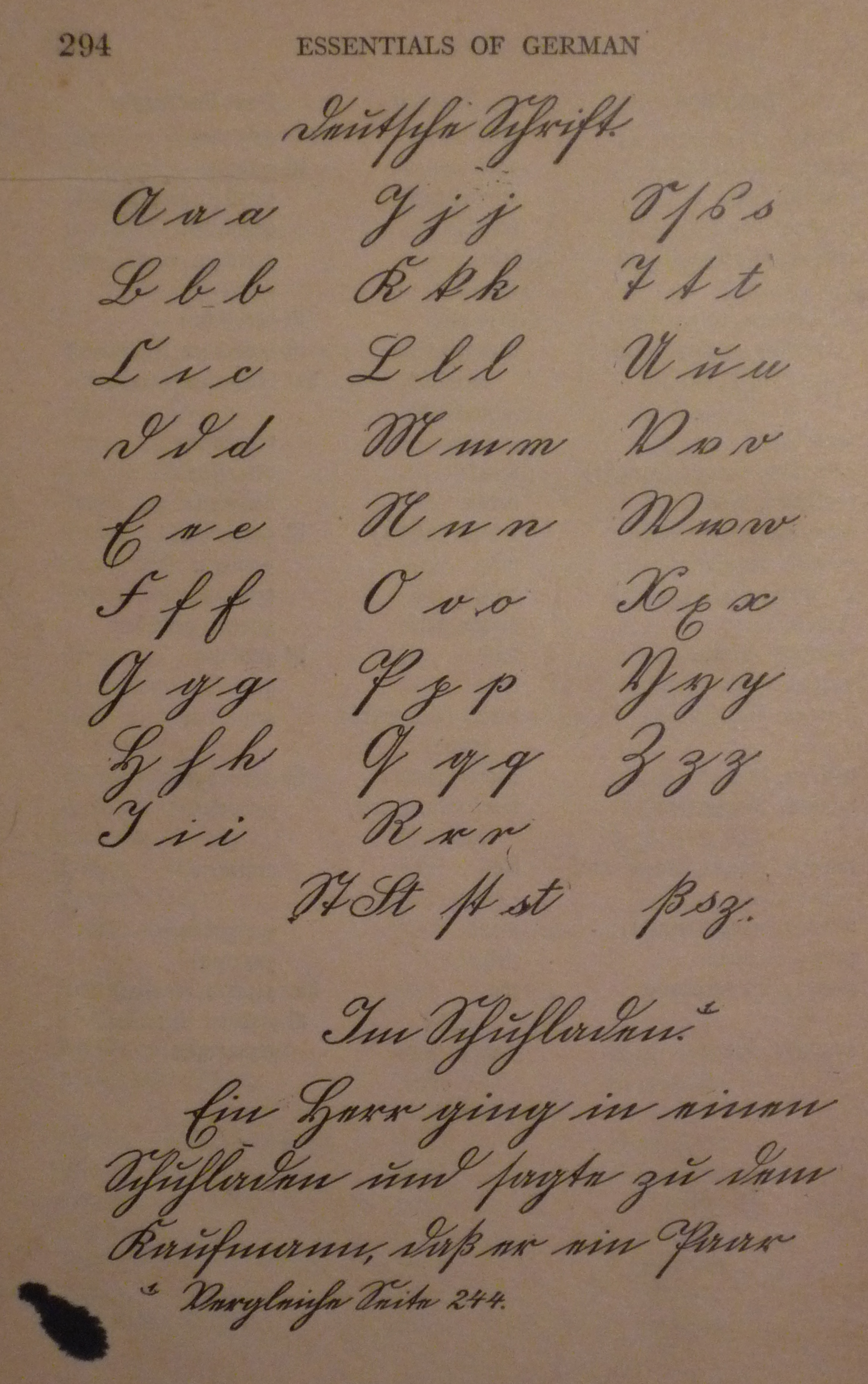
Kurrent script from a 1903–14 primer on German, the 26 letters, ligatures, start of sample text

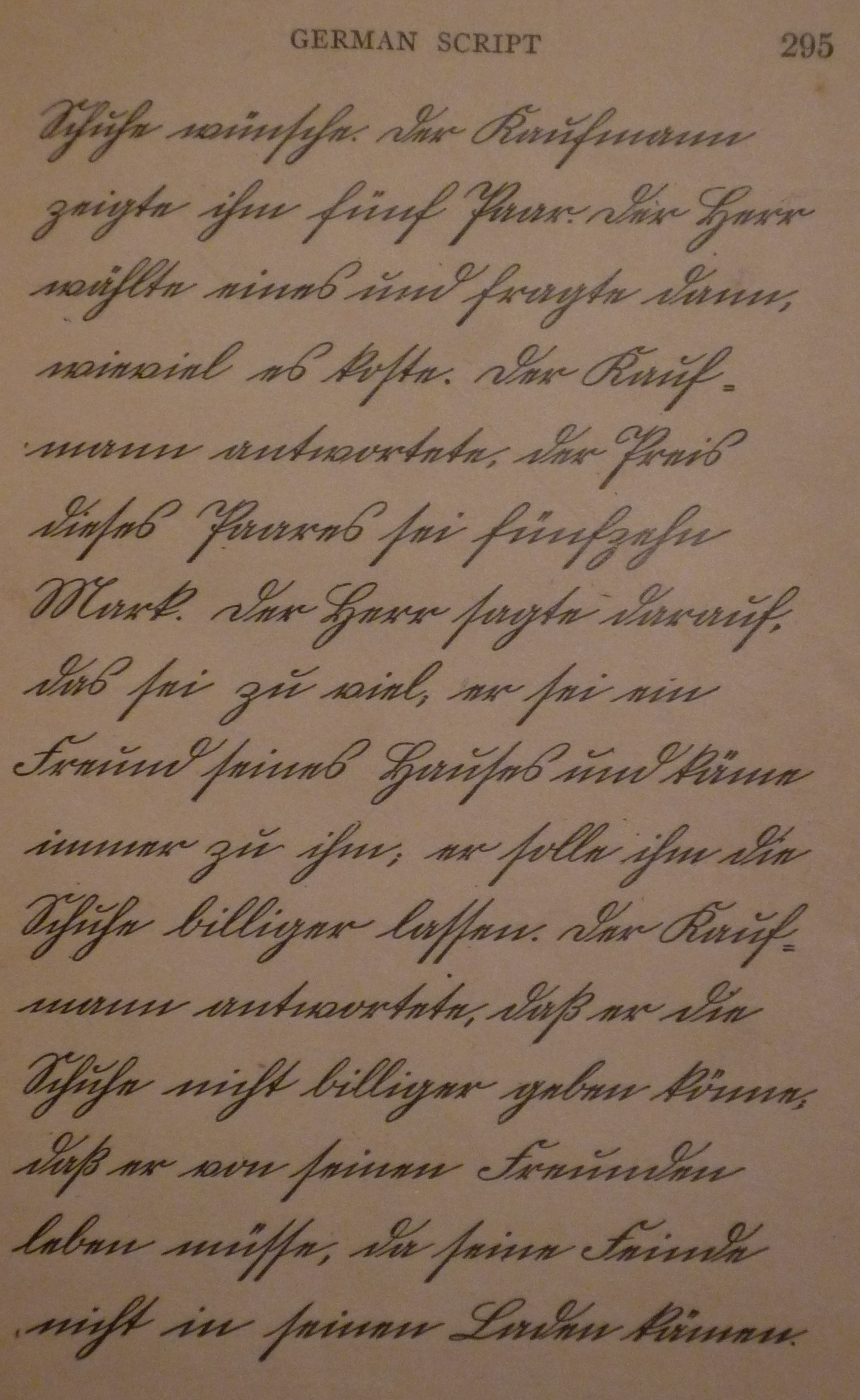
Kurrent script from a 1903–14 primer on German, the rest of the sample text

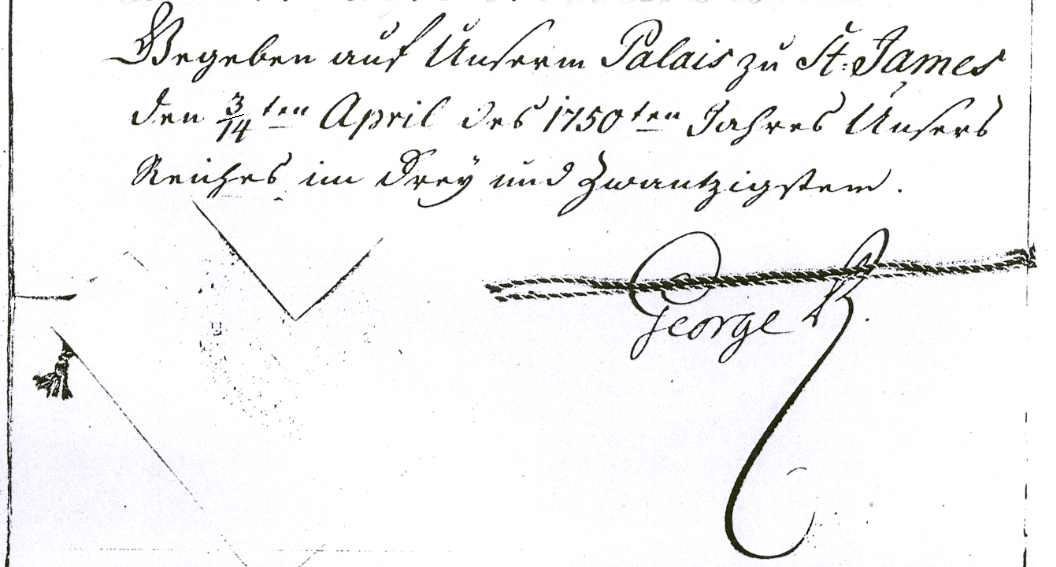
Final paragraph of a German contract from 1750 signed by George II, King of Great Britain and Elector of Hanover. It contains a mixture of Kurrent and 'Latin font' scripts.

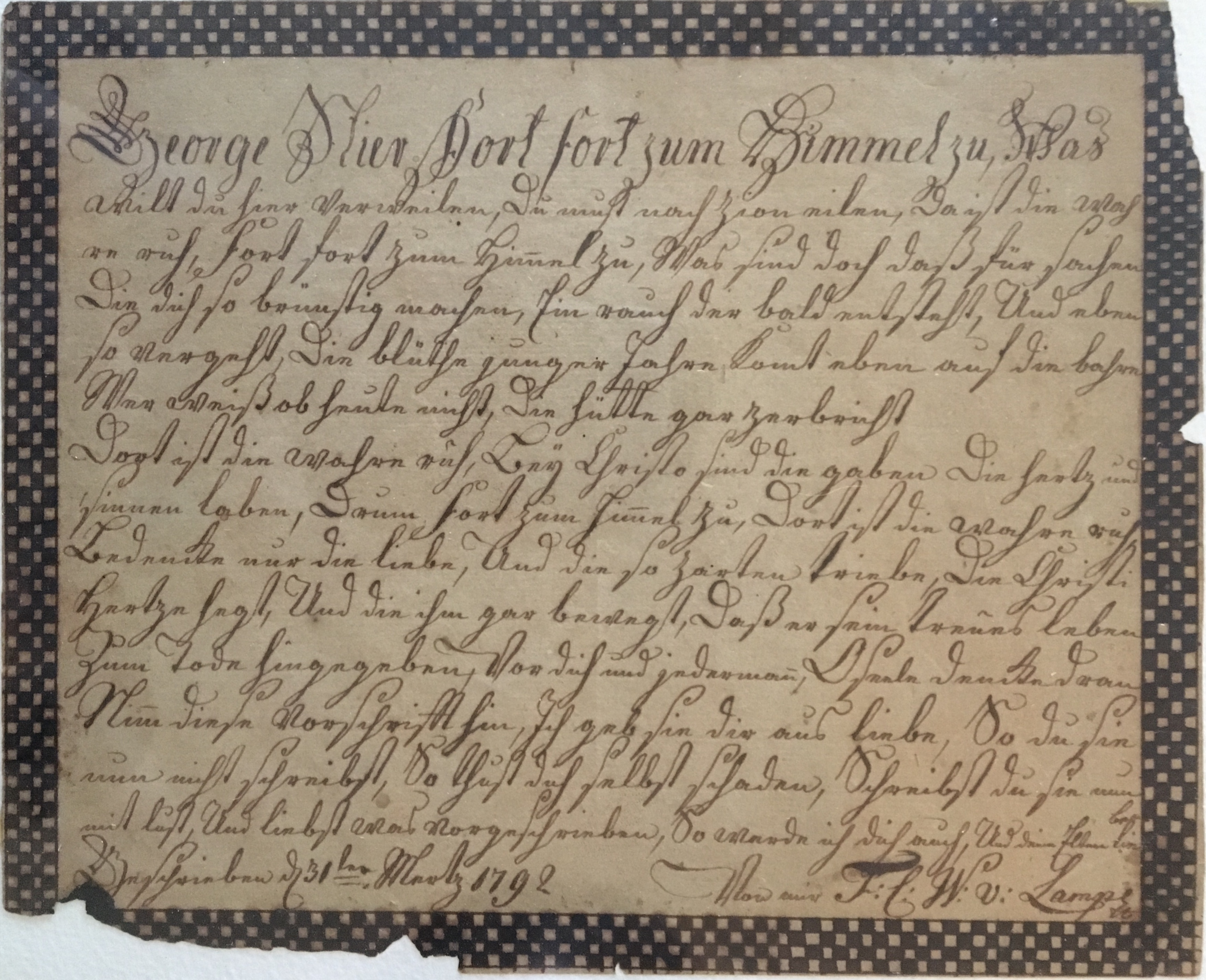
Handwritten letter, 1792

== See also ==
- Antiqua–Fraktur dispute
- Blackletter
- Fraktur
- Grundschrift
