= Vereinfachte Ausgangsschrift =

Writing system

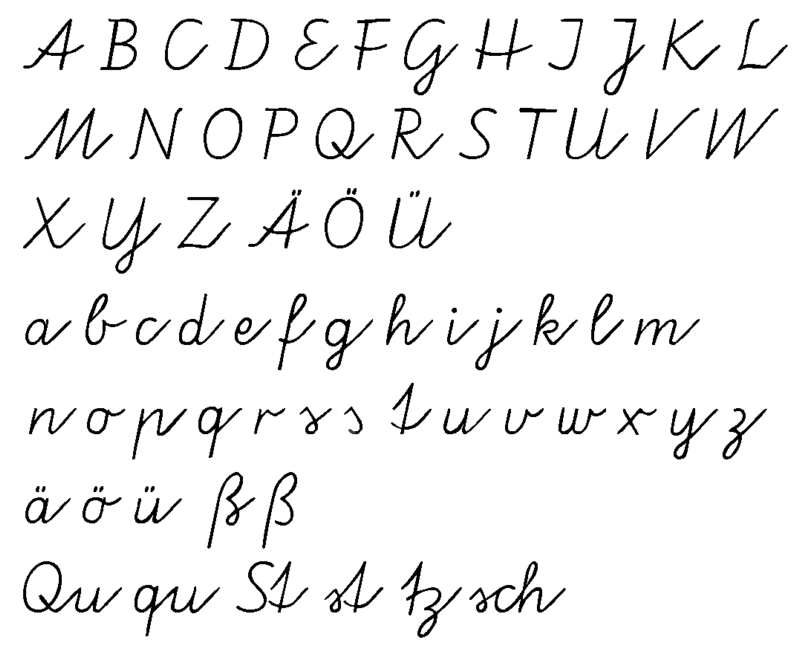
Letters in the Vereinfachte Ausgangsschrift

The Vereinfachte Ausgangsschrift (VAS, meaning "simplified initial script") is a simplified form of handwriting primarily based on the Lateinische Ausgangsschrift. It was developed in 1969 and tested since 1972. The letters have been simplified and the shapes approximated the block letters. In 10 of the 16 German federal states, it is available for schools to choose from, among other cursives.

The difficulties in learning the Latin script developed from the "Deutsche Normalschrift" prompted the development of a standardised cursive. The Vereinfachte Ausgangsschrift was intended to correct inconsistencies in the Latin source script and to develop a script that was easier to learn.

The Vereinfachte Ausgangsschrift is primarily based on the Lateinische Ausgangsschrift and is also based on the Druckschrift. During development, attention should be paid to a consistent and logical flow of writing, the analogy to the printed text, a light motor implementation and the avoidance of unnecessary decorative elements.

== Vereinfachte Ausgangsschrift compared to the Lateinische Ausgangsschrift ==
In the Vereinfachte Ausgangsschrift (VAS), almost all lowercase letters begin and end on the upper center line.

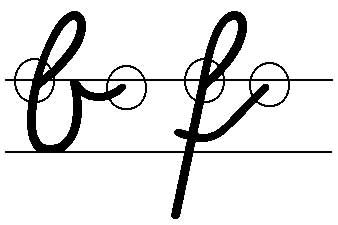

This is very important for the flow of writing, since the termination point of each letter is always the starting point for the next one. In Lateinische Ausgangsschrift (LAS), connecting the letters is considered to be easier in practice, but more difficult to learn because there are four different options. With VAS, almost all lowercase letters begin and end at the same place. The letters are therefore standardized in the simplified initial script. In LAS, there are several letter combinations for the same letter. (Example: LAS above, VAS below). VAS disrupts the flow of writing through “jerky” transitions, but enables textbook publishers to use a standardized typeface instead of costly handwritten sample texts.

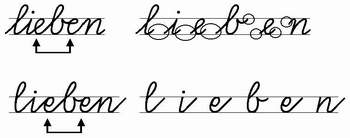
Example of a couple Latin phrases

A notable feature of VAS is the “tail”, e.g. on “b”, which, when letters are connected, only trails with the last letter of the word. However, this “tail” is an integral part of each letter, as it is intended to enable a fluid, uniform connection of the letters. The form of the lowercase "z" with sub-loop emphasizes that this script continues a centuries-old tradition in the lineage of Kurrentschrift and Fraktur.

The capital letters of Vereinfachte Ausgangsschrift differ from Lateinische Ausgangsschrift. The print script (Druckschrift) was used as a basis for the capitals in VAS because the students learn it first.

== Criticism ==
In 1996, the pedagogue Wilhelm Topsch discovered that, for the 1970s introduction of the Vereinfachte Ausgangsschrift, there was no expert's consultancy for it except of its inventor, Heinrich Grünewald. The study also proved to be filled with mistakes, contradicting data and unproven statements. The proportion of girls in the group for the Vereinfachte Ausgangsschrift was with 56% much higher than in the group for the Lateinische Ausgangsschrift, which was 44%. An additional study, which was carried out by Sigrun Richter in 1997, could make out no advantages of the Vereinfachte Ausgangsschrift.
