= Lee Bennett Hopkins =

American educator and anthologist (1938–2019)

- Born: April 13, 1938; Scranton, Pennsylvania, U.S.
- Died: August 8, 2019 (aged 81); Cape Coral, Florida, U.S.
- Education: Newark State College; Bank Street College of Education; Hunter College
- Occupations: Educator; poet; author; editor
- Spouse: Charles Egita (m. 2014)

Lee Bennett Hopkins (April 13, 1938 – August 8, 2019) was an American educator, poet, author, and anthologist. He authored or edited more than 100 books for children, as well as a number of books and articles for adults. Among his many honors and awards, he was inducted into the Florida Artists Hall of Fame in 2017.

== Early life and education ==
Hopkins was born in Scranton, Pennsylvania. When he was 13 his parents divorced and he moved with his mother and siblings to a low-income housing project in Newark, New Jersey. After high school he enrolled in Newark State Teachers College (now Kean University) in Union, New Jersey, where he majored in education. After graduating in 1960 he taught sixth grade at Westmoreland Elementary in Fair Lawn, New Jersey and pursued a master's degree at Bank Street College of Education in New York City. In 1967 he earned a degree in Administration from Hunter College of the City University of New York.

== Career ==
From 1966 to 1968 he served as a senior consultant to Bank Street College's Learning Resource Center in Harlem, New York, and from 1968 and 1976 he worked as a curriculum specialist for Scholastic Magazines, Inc. (now Scholastic Inc.). During those years he published a number of books including works for teachers, children's books, and anthologies of poetry, as well as articles that appeared in publications such as Horn Book and Language Arts (the professional journal of the National Council of Teachers of English).

In 1976 Hopkins left Scholastic to become a full-time writer and education advocate. He believes that poetry has an important place in education, and much of his professional writing is devoted to advancing the thesis and suggesting ways to integrate poetry into the curriculum. His 1972 book Pass the Poetry, Please (revised in 1987 and 1998) outlines his views on teaching poetry and includes biographies of several poets whose work he feels will appeal to children, and is consistently popular with teachers. His desire to match children to poems that will speak to them is also behind his prolific production of anthologies; he has been recognized as "the world’s most prolific anthologist of poetry for children" by Guinness World Records.

== Awards and honors ==
Hopkins received many awards and honors over his career. He received an honorary Doctor of Laws degree from Kean University in 1980 and in 1989 was awarded the University of Southern Mississippi Medallion for "lasting contributions to children's literature." His autobiographical poetry collection Been To Yesterdays was honored with the Christopher Award in 1995 and was Golden Kite Award honor book in 1996. In 2009 Hopkins was awarded the NCTE Award for Excellence in Poetry for Children for his lifetime body of work. In 2010, he was awarded a Florida Lifetime Achievement Award by the Southwest Florida Reading Festival, and in 2011 he received the Award for Excellence in Educational Leadership from the New Jersey Education Association (NJEA). In 2016, Hopkins received the prestigious Regina Medal award sponsored by the Catholic Library Association. In 2017, Hopkins was inducted into the Florida Artists Hall of Fame.

== Personal life ==
Hopkins lived in Cape Coral, Florida. His husband Charles announced his death on August 8, 2019.

== Legacy ==
- Namesake and founder, Lee Bennett Hopkins Award for Poetry. Established 1993 in cooperation with Pennsylvania Center for the Book.
- Namesake and founder, ILA Lee Bennett Hopkins Promising Poet Award. Established 1995 in cooperation with the International Reading Association.
- Namesake and founder, Lee Bennett Hopkins SCBWI Poetry Award. Established 2015 in cooperation with the Society of Children's Book Writers and Illustrators.
- Founder, Annual Lee Bennett Hopkins Writing Institute for Children. In cooperation with Florida Southwestern State College in Ft. Myers, Florida.

== Works ==
=== Professional books ===
2015 SKPU Students

- Creative Activities for Gifted Children. With Annette Frank Shaprio. Fearon, 1968.
- Books Are by People: interviews with 104 authors and illustrators of books for young children. Citation Press, 1969.
- Let Them Be Themselves: Language Arts Enrichment for Disadvantaged Children in Elementary Schools. Citation Press, 1969. Second edition (published as Let Them Be Themselves: Language Arts for Children in Elementary Schools), 1974. Third edition, Harper, 1992.
- Partners in Learning: A Child-Centered Approach to Teaching the Social Studies. With Misha Arenstein. Citation Press, 1971.
- Pass the Poetry, Please!: Bringing Poetry into the Minds and Hearts of Children. Citation Press, 1972. Third revised edition, HarperCollins, 1998.
- More Books by More People. Citation Press, 1974.
- Do You Know What Day Tomorrow Is?: A Teacher's Almanac. With Misha Arenstein. Citation Press, 1975.
- The Best of Book Bonanza. Holt, 1980
- Pauses: Autobiographical Reflections on 101 Creators of Children's Books. HarperCollins, 1995.

=== Young-adult novels ===
- Mama. Alfred A.Knopf. Dell Paperback. 1977. Reprinted by Boyds Mills Press, 2000.
- Wonder Wheels. Alfred A. Knopf. Dell Paperback, 1980.
- Mama and Her Boys. Harper, 1981. Reprinted by Boyds Mills Press, 2000.

=== Children's books ===
- Important Dates in Afro-American History. F. Watts, 1969.
- This Street's for Me (poetry), Illustrated by Ann Grifalconi. Crown, 1970.
- Charlie's World: A Book of Poems. Illustrated by Charles Robinson. Bobbs-Merrill, 1972.
- Kim's Place and Other Poems. Illustrated by Lawrence DiFiori. Holt, 1974.
- I Loved Rose Ann. Illustrated by Ingrid Fetz. Knopf, 1976.
- The Writing Bug: An Autobiography. Richard C. Owen, 1994.
- Been to Yesterdays: Poems of a Life. Boyds Mills Press, 1995.
- Good Rhymes, Good Times!. Illustrated by Frané Lessac. HarperCollins, 1995.
- Alphathoughts: Alphabet Poems. Illustrated by Marla Baggetta. Boyds Mills Press/Wordsong, 2003.
- City I Love. Illustrated by Marcellus Hall. Abrams, 2010.
- Full Moon and Star. Illustrated by Marcellus Hall. Abrams, 2011.
- Mary's Song. Illustrated by Stephen Alcorn. Eerdmans, 2012.

=== Anthologies ===
- I Think I Saw a Snail: Young Poems for City Seasons. Illustrated by Harold James. Crown, 1969.
- Don't You Turn Back: Poems by Langston Hughes. Illustrated by Ann Grifalconi, foreword by Arna Bontemps. Knopf, 1969.
- City Talk. Illustrated by Roy Arnella. Knopf, 1970.
- Faces and Places: Poems for You. With Misha Arenstein, illustrated by Lisl Weil. Scholastic, 1970.
- The City Spreads Its Wings. Illustrated by Moneta Barnett. Franklin Watts, 1970.
- Me!: A Book of Poems. Illustrated by Talavaldis Stubis. Seabury, 1970.
- Zoo!: A Book of Poems. Illustrated by Robert Frankenberg. Crown, 1971.
- Girls Can Too!: A Book of Poems. Illustrated by Emily McCully. Franklin Watts, 1972.
- Happy Birthday to Me!. Scholastic, 1972.
- When I Am All Alone: A Book of Poems. Scholastic, 1972.
- Time to Shout: Poems for You. With Misha Arenstein, illustrated by Lisl Weil. Scholastic, 1973.
- I Really Want to Feel Good about Myself: Poems by Former Addicts. With Sunna Rasch. Thomas Nelson, 1974.
- On Our Way: Poems of Pride and Love. Illustrated by David Parks. Knopf, 1974.
- Hey-How for Halloween. Illustrated by Janet McCaffery. Harcourt, 1974.
- Take Hold!: An Anthology of Pulitzer Prize-Winning Poems. Thomas Nelson, 1974.
- Poetry on Wheels. Illustrated by Frank Aloise. Garrard, 1974.
- Sing Hey for Christmas Day. Illustrated by Laura Jean Allen. Harcourt, 1975.
- A Haunting We Will Go: Ghostly Stories and Poems. Illustrated by Vera Rosenberry. Albert Whitman, 1976.
- Witching Time: Mischievous Stories and Poems. Illustrated by Vera Rosenberry. Albert Whitman, 1976.
- Good Morning to You, Valentine. Illustrated by Tomie dePaola. Harcourt, 1976.
- Merrily Comes Our Harvest In. Illustrated by Ben Shecter. Harcourt, 1976.
- Thread One to a Star. With Misha Arenstein. Four Winds, 1976.
- Potato Chips and a Slice of Moon: Poems You'll Like. With Misha Arenstein, illustrated by Wayne Blickenstaff. Scholastic, 1976.
- Beat the Drum! Independence Day Has Come. Illustrated by Tomie dePaola. Harcourt, 1977.
- Monsters, Ghoulies, and Creepy Creatures: Fantastic Stories and Poems. Illustrated by Vera Rosenberry. Albert Whitman. 1977.
- To Look at Any Thing. Illustrated by John Earl. Harcourt, 1978.
- Pups, Dogs, Foxes, and Wolves: Stories, Poems, and Verse. Illustrated by Vera Rosenberry. Albert Whitman, 1979.
- Kits, Cats, Lions, and Tigers: Stories, Poems, and Verse. Illustrated by Vera Rosenberry. Albert Whitman, 1979.
- Go to Bed: A Book of Bedtime Poems. Illustrated by Rosekrans Hoffman. Knopf, 1979.
- Easter Buds Are Springing: Poems for Easter. Illustrated by Tomie dePaola. Harcourt, 1979.
- Merely Players: An Anthology of Life Poems. Thomas Nelson, 1979.
- My Mane Catches the Wind: Poems about Horses. Illustrated by Sam Savitt. Harcourt, 1979.
- By Myself. Illustrated by Glo Coalson. Crowell, 1980.
- Elves, Fairies, and Gnomes. Illustrated by Rosekrans Hoffman. Knopf, 1980.
- Moments: Poems about the Seasons. Illustrated by Michael Hague. Harcourt, 1980.
- Morning, Noon, and Nighttime, Too!. Illustrated by Nancy Hannans. Harper, 1980.
- I Am the Cat. Illustrated by Linda Rochester Richards. Harcourt, 1981.
- And God Bless Me: Prayers, Lullabies and Dream-Poems. Illustrated by Patricia Henderson Lincoln. Knopf, 1982.
- Circus! Circus!. Illustrated by John O'Brien. Knopf, 1982.
- Rainbows Are Made: Poems by Carl Sandburg. Illustrated by Fritz Eichenberg. Harcourt, 1982.
- A Dog's Life. Illustrated by Linda Rochester Richards. Harcourt, 1983.
- How Do You Make an Elephant Float?, and Other Delicious Food Riddles. Illustrated by Rosekrans Hoffman. Albert Whitman, 1983.
- Animals from Mother Goose. Illustrated by Kathryn Hewitt. Harcourt, 1983.
- People from Mother Goose. Illustrated by Kathryn Hewitt. Harcourt, 1983.
- The Sky Is Full of Song. Illustrated by Dirk Zimmer. Harper, 1983.
- A Song in Stone: City Poems. Illustrated by Anna Held Audette. Crowell, 1983.
- Crickets and Bullfrogs and Whispers of Thunder: Poems and Pictures by Harry Behn. Harcourt, 1984.
- Love and Kisses. Illustrated by Kris Boyd. Houghton, 1984.
- Surprises: An I-Can-Read Book of Poems. Illustrated by Meagan Lloyd. Harper, 1984.
- Creatures. Illustrated by Stella Ormai. Harcourt, 1985.
- Munching: Poems about Eating. Illustrated by Nelle Davis. Little, Brown, and Co., 1985.
- Best Friends. Illustrated by James Watts. Harper, 1986.
- The Sea Is Calling Me. Illustrated by Walter Gaffney-Kessel. Harcourt, 1986.
- Click, Rumble, Roar: Poems about Machines. Illustrated by Anna Held Audette. Crowell, 1987.
- Dinosaurs. Illustrated by Murray Tinkelman. Harcourt, 1987.
- More Surprises: An I-Can-Read Book. Illustrated by Meagan Lloyd. Harper, 1987.
- Voyages: Poems by Walt Whitman. Illustrated by Charles Mikolaycak. Harcourt, 1988.
- Side by Side: Poems to Read Together. Illustrated by Hilary Knight. Simon & Schuster, 1988.
- Still as a Star: Nighttime Poems. Illustrated by Karen Malone. Little, Brown, and Co., 1988.
- Good Books, Good Times!. Illustrated by Harvey Stevenson. Harper, 1990.
- On the Farm. Illustrated by Laurel Molk. Little, Brown, and Co., 1991.
- Happy Birthday. IIus. by Hilary Knight. Simon & Schuster, 1991.
- Questions: An I-Can-Read Book. Illustrated by Carolyn Croll. HarperCollins, 1992.
- Through Our Eyes: Poems and Pictures about Growing Up. Illustrated by Jeffrey Dunn. Little, Brown, and Co., 1992.
- To the Zoo: Animal Poems. Illustrated by John Wallner. Little, Brown, and Co., 1992.
- Ring out, Wild Bells: Poems of Holidays and Seasons. Illustrated by Karen Baumann. Harcourt, 1992.
- Pterodactyls and Pizza: A Trumpet Club Book of Poetry. Illustrated by Nadine Bernard Westcott. Trumpet Club, 1992.
- Flit, Flutter, Fly!: Poems about Bugs and Other Crawly Creatures. Illustrated by Peter Palagonia. Doubleday, 1992.
- Ragged Shadows: Poems of Halloween Night. Illustrated by Giles Laroche. Little, Brown, and Co., 1993.
- Extra Innings: Baseball Poems. Illustrated by Scott Medlock. Harcourt, 1993.
- It's about Time. Illustrated by Matt Novak. Simon & Schuster, 1993.
- Hand in Hand: An American History through Poetry. Illustrated by Peter Fiore. Simon & Schuster, 1994.
- April, Bubbles, Chocolate: An ABC of Poetry. Illustrated by Barry Root. Simon & Schuster, 1994.
- Weather: An I-Can-Read Book. Illustrated by Melanie Hill. HarperCollins, 1994.
- Blast Off: Poems about Space: An I-Can-Read Book. Illustrated by Melissa Sweet. HarperCollins, 1995.
- Small Talk: A Book of Short Poems. Illustrated by Susan Gaber. Harcourt, 1995.
- School Supplies. Illustrated by Renee Flower. Simon & Schuster, 1996.
- Opening Days: Sports Poems. Illustrated by Scott Medlock. Harcourt, 1996.
- Marvelous Math: A Book of Poems. Illustrated by Karen Barbour. Simon & Schuster, 1997.
- Song and Dance. Illustrated by Cheryl Munro Taylor. Simon & Schuster, 1997.
- All God's Children: A Book of Prayers. Illustrated by Amanda Schaffer. Harcourt Brace, 1998.
- Climb into My Lap: First Poems to Read Together. Illustrated by Kathryn Brown. Simon & Schuster, 1998.
- Dino-Roars. Illustrated by Cynthia Fisher. Golden Books, 1999.
- Lives: Poems about Famous Americans. Illustrated by Leslie Staub. HarperCollins, 1999.
- Spectacular Science: A Book of Poems. Illustrated by Virginia Halstead. Simon & Schuster, 1999.
- Sports! Sports! Sports!: An I-Can-Read Book. Illustrated by Brian Floca. HarperCollins, 1999.
- My America: A Poetry Atlas of the United States. Illustrated by Stephen Alcorn. Simon & Schuster, 2000.
- Yummy!: Eating through a Day. Illustrated by Renee Flower. Simon & Schuster, 2000.
- Hoofbeats, Claws & Rippled Fins: Creature Poems. Illustrated by Stephen Alcorn. HarperCollins, 2002.
- Home to Me: Poems across America. Illustrated by Stephen Alcorn. Orchard, 2002.
- A Pet for Me: An I-Can-Read-Book. Illustrated by Jane Manning. HarperCollins, 2003.
- Wonderful Words: Poems about Reading, Writing, Speaking, and Listening. Illustrated by Karen Barbour. Simon & Schuster, 2004.
- Hanukkah Lights: Holiday Poetry. Illustrated by Melanie Hall. HarperCollins, 2004.
- Christmas Presents: Holiday Poetry. Illustrated by Melanie Hall. HarperCollins, 2004.
- Days to Celebrate: A Full Year of Poetry, People, Holidays, History, Fascinating Facts, and More. Illustrated by Stephen Alcorn. Greenwillow, 2005.
- Valentine Hearts: Holiday Poetry. Illustrated by JoAnn Adinolfi. HarperCollins, 2005.
- Oh, No! Where Are My Pants?, and Other Disasters: Poems. Illustrated by Wolf Erlbruch. HarperCollins, 2005.
- Halloween Howls: Holiday Poetry. Illustrated by Stacey Schuett. HarperCollins, 2005.
- Got Geography!. Illustrated by Philip Stanton. Greenwillow, 2006.
- Behind the Museum Door: Poems to Celebrate the Wonders of Museums. Illustrated by Stacey Dressen-McQueen. Abrams, 2007.
- Hamsters, Shells, and Spelling Bees: School Poems. Illustrated by Sachiko Yoshikawa. HarperCollins, 2008.
- America at War. Illustrated by Stephen Alcorn. McElderry, 2008.
- Sky Magic. Illustrated by Mariusz Stawaski. Dutton, 2009.
- Incredible Inventions. Illustrated by Julia Sarcone Roach. Greenwillow, 2009.
- Sharing The Seasons. Illustrated by David Diaz. McElderry, 2010.
- Amazing Faces. Illustrated by Chris Soentpiet. Lee & Low, 2010.
- Give Me Wings. Illustrated by Ponder Goembel. Holiday House, 2010.
- Hear My Prayer. Illustrated by Gretchen "Gigi" Moore. Zonderkidz, 2011.
- I Am the Book. Illustrated by Yayo. Holiday House, 2011.
- Dizzy Dinosaurs. Illustrated by Barr Gott. HarperCollins, 2011.
- Nasty Bugs. Illustrated by Will Terry. Dial, 2012.
- All The World's A Stage. Illustrated by Guy Billout. Creative Editions, 2013.
- Manger. Illustrated by Helen Cann. Eerdmans Books for Young Readers, 2014.
- Lullaby and Kisses Sweet: Poems to Love with Your Baby. Illustrated by Alyssa Nassner. Harry N. Abrams, 2015.
- Jumping Off Library Shelves. Illustrated by Jane Manning. Wordsong, 2015.
- Amazing Places. Illustrated by Chris Soentpiet and Christy Hale. Lee & Low Books, 2015.
- Traveling the Blue Road: Poems of the Sea. Illustrated by Bob and Jovan Hansman. Seagrass Press, 2017.
- School People. Illustrated by Ellen Shi. Wordsong, 2018.
- A Bunch of Punctuation. Illustrated by Serge Bloch. Wordsong, 2018.
- World Make Way: New Poems Inspired by Art from The Metropolitan Museum. Harry N. Abrams, 2018.
- I Am Someone Else: Poems About Pretending. Illustrated by Chris Hsu. Charlesbridge, 2019.
- I Remember: Poems and Pictures of Heritage. Various illustrators. Lee & Low, 2019.
- Construction People. Illustrated by Ellen Shi. Wordsong, 2020.
- Night Wishes. Illustrated by Jen Corace. Eerdmans Books for Young Readers, 2020.
