= Ruth Hoffmann =

Ruth Hoffmann may refer to:

- Ruth Hubbard née Hoffmann (1924–2016), American biologist
- Ruth Rosekrans Hoffman (1926–2007), American artist and illustrator
