= Charles Paxton Zaner =

American calligrapher and pen artist

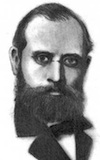
- Born: February 15, 1864; Bloomsburg, Pennsylvania, United States
- Died: December 1, 1918 (aged 54); Mifflin, Ohio, United States
- Occupation(s): Master Penman and Educator
- Known for: Business and Ornamental Penmanship, Editor, Education

Signature
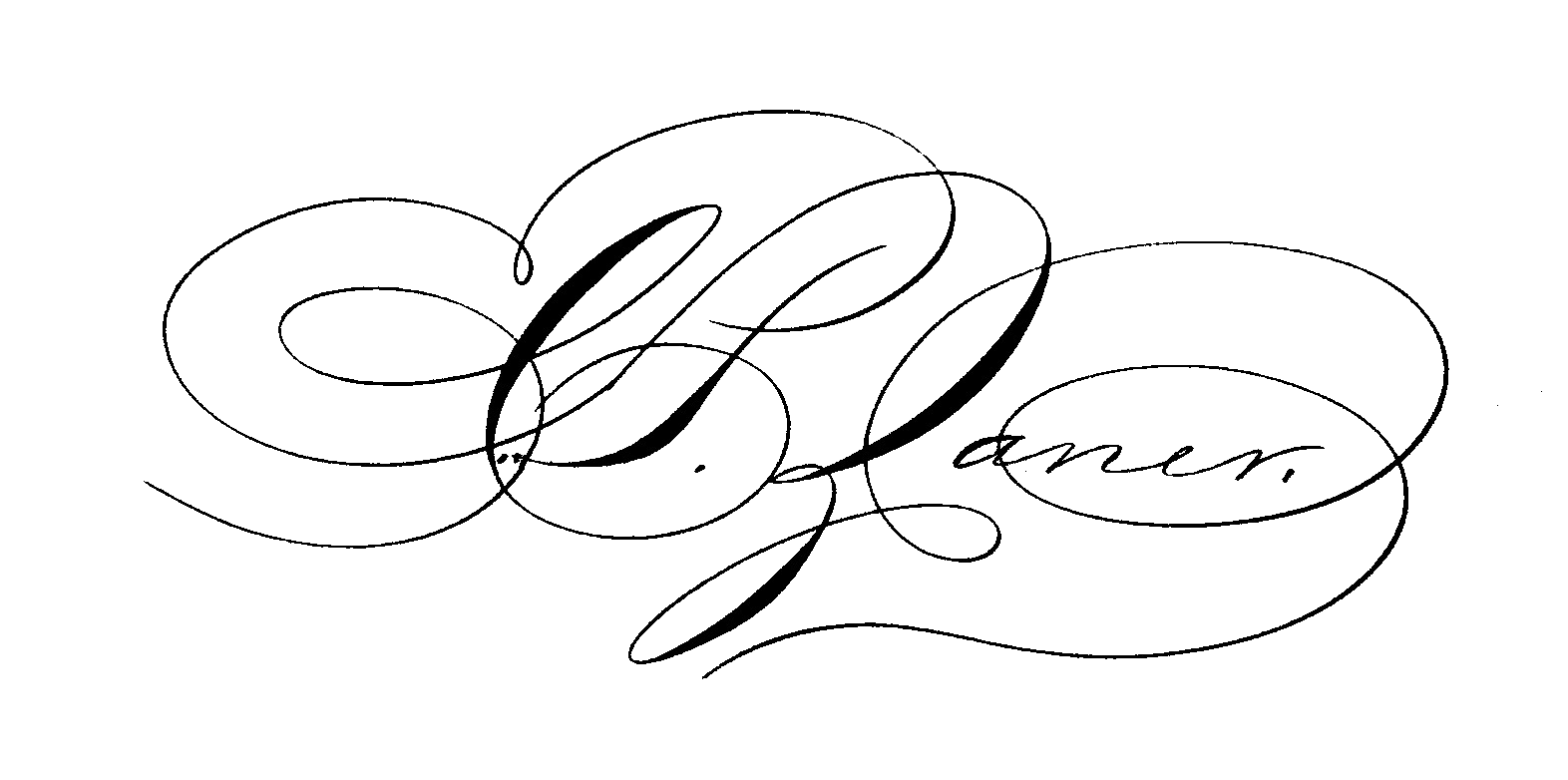

Charles Paxton Zaner (February 15, 1864 – December 1, 1918) was an American calligrapher, pen artist, and teacher of penmanship.

== Biography ==
Zaner was born near Bloomsburg, Pennsylvania. He attended G. W. Michael's Pen Art Hall course in penmanship in Oberlin, Ohio, in 1882. By 1888, Zaner had been a teacher of penmanship at two Ohio colleges, and after the second had closed, he decided to open his own college where he could teach the art. Zaner's school was originally known as Zanerian Art College and was a joint venture with Lloyd Kelchner. In 1891, Zaner sold Elmer W. Bloser a share of the school. Kelchner left before the end of the year, resulting with Zaner and Bloser becoming equal partners. This company eventually became what is now the Zaner-Bloser Company and operated the Zanerian College of Penmanship in Columbus, Ohio.

Zaner died on the evening of December 1, 1918, in Mifflin, Ohio, when the car in which he was riding was struck by an oncoming train.

== Zaner's Work ==
=== Penmanship research ===
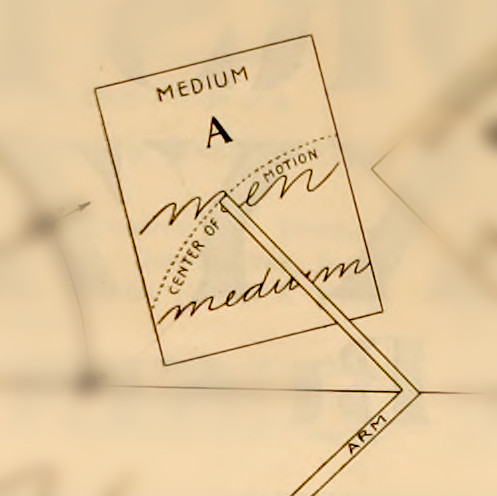
Detail from Zaner's 1896 article: The Line of Direction in Writing

sample the Zaner-Bloser teaching script

Zaner's work, together with that of Elmer W. Bloser (1865–1929), his business partner in the Zanerian College of Penmanship, led to the development of the Zaner-Bloser style of writing and teaching handwriting.

A major factor contributing to the development of the Zaner-Bloser teaching script was Zaner's study of the body movements required to create the form of cursive letters when using the 'muscular arm method' of handwriting, which was prevalent in the United States from the late 19th century (e.g. Palmer Method).

Zaner considered the hinge action of the forearm as the 'central energy of movement' and that its relation to the direction of writing, or page angle, could affect letter form and the effort required. By changing from a page angle which placed letter down strokes on a line towards the center of the body, as other educators advised, Zaner offered a means to link muscle effort with balanced (medium), condensed (compact style), or extended (running hand) letter forms.

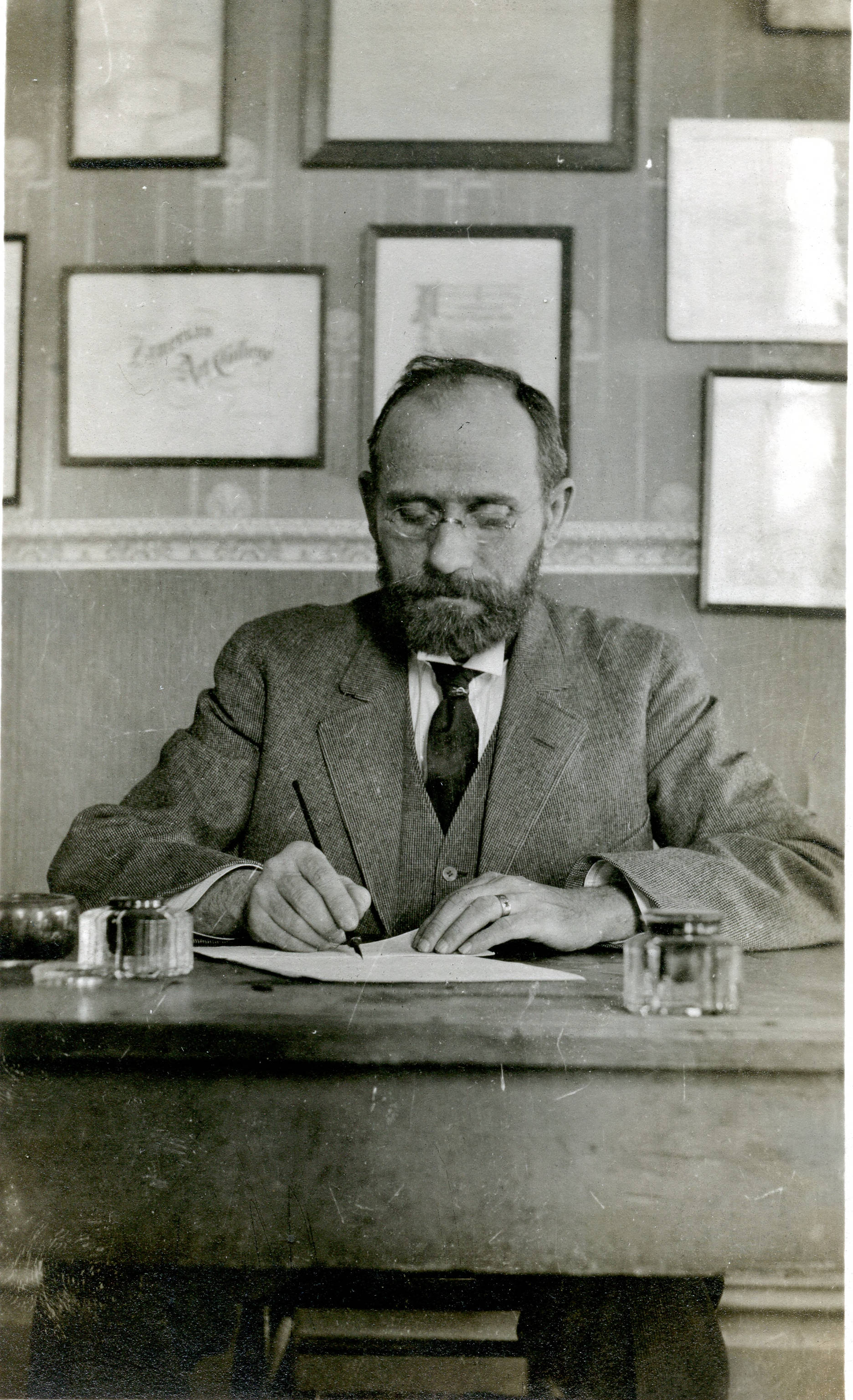
C.P. Zaner: muscular arm method writing

In most styles of cursive handwriting that existed in Zaner's time, the fingers used to support and steady the hand on the page for arm movement were fixed in relation to the pen (a typical instruction to writers according to the Palmer Method was that "the nails of the third and fourth fingers should rest lightly on the paper, and should follow the course of the pen in every direction"). In order to simplify the process of writing by hand, Zaner analysed how professional users of the then-existing handwriting styles used their 'rest' fingers to control movement. For writing lower case letters, Zaner recommended a technique of letting the little finger slide to the right in making up strokes, but to rest or drag for down strokes in order to improve control of the arm movement. This required the joints of the 'rest' fingers to act on the down strokes, independent of those holding the pen, which Zaner termed as 'hand action'.

=== Professional Pen Work ===
In the field of professional penmanship as a fine art, Zaner produced educational material and instruction, going beyond the copybook as in his lessons for school and commercial handwriting. His capital letters for Ornamental Penmanship appearing with comments by Earl A. Lupfer in The Educator showed how basic forms could be extended by flourishes with "balance, symmetry, and grace".

=== Graphic Arts ===
Zaner also provided instruction in drawing and illustration; and, as with penmanship, he encouraged individuality and discovery rather than the rigid following of a prescribed method.

Do not think the technique employed is the only method — "there are others" — as many as there are artists, so do not follow, but invent.

== Zaner's Publications ==
- Lessons in Business Penmanship (1892-3)
- Lessons in Business Penmanship (1894-5)
- Lessons in Professional Writing (1895)
- The Line of Direction in Writing (1896)
- The Road to Sketching from Nature (1898)
- The Arm Movement Method of Rapid Writing (1904)
- Lessons In Ornamental Penmanship (1909)
