= Chris Soentpiet =

Korean American children's book illustrator and author

- Born: Han Kun Seop; January 3, 1970 (age 56); Seoul, South Korea
- Education: Pratt Institute
- Occupations: Writer, illustrator, artist
- Spouse: Yin (m. 1970)
- Writing career
- Genre: Children's literature
- Notable work: Coolies (2001)
- Website: www.soentpiet.com

Chris K. Soentpiet (born January 3, 1970, in Seoul) is a Korean American children's book illustrator and author. He was born in Seoul, South Korea, in 1970. At age 8, he moved to Hawaii to live with his adoptive family. A year later, the Soentpiets relocated to Portland, Oregon. Soentpiet currently lives and works in New York City.

Around Town, a picture book written and illustrated by Soentpiet, marked the artist's debut in 1994. Today, Soentpiet is recognized as an award-winning illustrator in the children's book industry. His books have received numerous honors, including, but not limited to, the International Reading Association Teachers' Choice Award, NAACP Image Award, Parents' Choice Gold Award, Parents Magazine Best Children's Book of the Year, North Carolina Children's Book Award, Georgia Children's Picture Book Award, International Reading Association Notable Children's Book for a Global Society, and ALA Notable Book. Soentpiet is active on the school visit circuit.

Soentpiet's research for the picture chapter book Peacebound Trains (author: Haemi Balgassi) took him back to his country of birth, South Korea, for the first time since his adoption in 1978. In 1996, Soentpiet won the Society of Illustrators Gold Medal for his paintings in Peacebound Trains. The United States Department of Defense published an online edition of the book and featured it, complete with a Teacher Activity Guide, on the United States of America Korean War Commemoration site. Peacebound Trains is the only book to receive this honor.

On his official website and a number of interviews, the artist credits Ted Lewin and Betsy Lewin for encouraging him to pursue a career as a children's book illustrator.

== Awards and honors ==
Three of the books Soentpiet illustrated are Junior Library Guild selections: So Far from the Sea (1998), Coolies (2001), and Brothers (2007). The Association for Library Service to Children has named three of the books Soentpiet illustrated as Notable Children's Books: More Than Anything Else (1996), Molly Bannaky (2000), and Coolies (2002). In 1995, the Smithsonian named The Last Dragon by Susan Miho Nunes among the year's Notable Books for Children.

Soentpiet's books have also received the following accolades:

- 1995, 1996: American Bookseller Pick of the List
- 1995, 1997: Notable Children's Trade Books in the Field of Social Studies
- 1996: Black History Top 25 Pick for Youth
- 1996: Chicago Tribune Top 10 Children Books
- 1996, 2000, 2004: The International Reading Award Teachers' Choice Award
- 1996, 1997: American Bookseller Pick of the List
- 1998: International Reading Award Notable Book for a Global Society
- 1998: NCSS-CBC Notable Trade Book in Field of Social Studies
- 1998: Parents Best Children's Book of the Year
- 2000: Texas Bluebonnet Award-Nominee
- 2001: Maryland Children's Book Award-Nominee
- 2001: Nest Literary Classics
- 2003: Child Best Book of the Year
- 2004: Children's Book Sense 76 Pick
- 2005: Kansas State Reading Circle
- 2006-2007: Master Reading List, Volunteer State Book Award
- NCSS/CBC Notable Children's Trade Book in the Field of Social Studies
- San Francisco Chronicles Best Book List
- Peggy Sharp, Ed.D Pick 2000
- North Carolina Children's Book Award
- New York Public Library Top 100 Titles

Awards for Soentpiet's books
Year	Title	Award	Result	Ref.
1996	More than Anything Else	ILA Children’s and Young Adults’ Book Award	Winner	
1999	Molly Bannaky	Jane Addams Children's Book Award	Winner	
1999		FOCAL Award Best Book	Winner	
2000		Golden Kite Award	Honor	
2000		Oppenheim Toy Portfolio Award	Winner	
2001	Coolies	Parents' Choice Award	Winner	
2001-03	Coolies	Asian/Pacific American Awards for Literature: Picture Book	Honor	
2006-07	Brothers	Asian/Pacific American Awards for Literature: Picture Book	Honor	
2015	Amazing Places	Parents' Choice Award for Poetry	Winner	

== Books ==
- Soentpiet, Chris K. (1994). Around Town. New York: Lothrop, Lee & Shepard Books. ISBN 978-0-688-04572-2.
- Bradby, Marie (1995). More than anything else. New York: Orchard Books. ISBN 978-0-531-09464-8.
- Nunes, Susan (1995). The last dragon. New York: Clarion Books. ISBN 978-0-395-67020-0.
- Balgassi, Haemi (1996). Peacebound trains. New York: Clarion Books. ISBN 978-0-395-72093-6.
- Rylant, Cynthia (1997). Silver packages: an Appalachian Christmas story. New York: Orchard Books. ISBN 978-0-531-30051-0.
- Bunting, Eve (1998). So Far from the Sea. New York: Clarion Books. ISBN 978-0-395-72095-0.
- Lyon, George Ella (1998). A sign. New York: Orchard Books. ISBN 978-0-531-30073-2.
- Wyeth, Sharon Dennis (1998). Something beautiful. New York: Doubleday Books for Young Readers. ISBN 978-0-385-32239-3.
- McGill, Alice (1999). Molly Bannaky. Boston, Mass: Houghton Mifflin. ISBN 978-0-395-72287-9.
- Rosenberg, Liz (1999). The silence in the mountains. New York: Orchard Books. ISBN 978-0-531-30084-8.
- Barron, T. A. (2000). Where is Grandpa?. New York: Philomel Books. ISBN 978-0-399-23037-0.
- Bradby, Marie (2000). Momma, where are you from?. New York: Orchard Books. ISBN 978-0-531-30105-0.
- Bunting, Eve (2001). Jin Woo. New York: Clarion Books. ISBN 978-0-395-93872-0.
- Yin (2001). Coolies. New York: Philomel Books. ISBN 978-0-399-23227-5.
- Yin (2002). Dear Santa, Please Come to the 19th Floor. New York: Philomel Books. ISBN 978-0-399-23636-5.
- Farris, Christine King (2003). My Brother Martin: A Sister Remembers Growing Up with the Rev. Dr. Martin Luther King Jr. New York: Simon & Schuster Books for Young Readers. ISBN 978-0-689-84387-7.
- Laminack, Lester L. (2004). Saturdays and teacakes. Atlanta: Peachtree. ISBN 978-1-56145-303-0.
- Yin (2006). Brothers. New York: Philomel Books. ISBN 978-0-399-23406-4.
- Raven, Margot Theis (2008). Happy birthday to you! the mystery behind the most famous song in the world. Chelsea, Michigan: Sleeping Bear Press. ISBN 978-1-58536-169-4.
- Hopkins, Lee Bennett (2010). Amazing faces. New York: Lee & Low Books. ISBN 978-1-60060-334-1. OCLC 405105354.
- Bates, Katharine Lee; Collier, Bryan (2013). America the beautiful: together we stand. New York: Orchard Books. ISBN 978-0-545-49207-2.
- Hopkins, Lee Bennett (2015). Amazing places: poems. Co-illustrated by Christy Hale. New York: Lee & Low Books Inc. ISBN 978-1-60060-653-3.

== Media ==
- Newsday: "From Dark to Light: An artist paints a new life through his books"
- New York Daily News: "Children's Book Artist is a Medal Winner"
- Korean Quarterly: "Evoking History with Art"
