= Mifflin, Ohio =

- Village
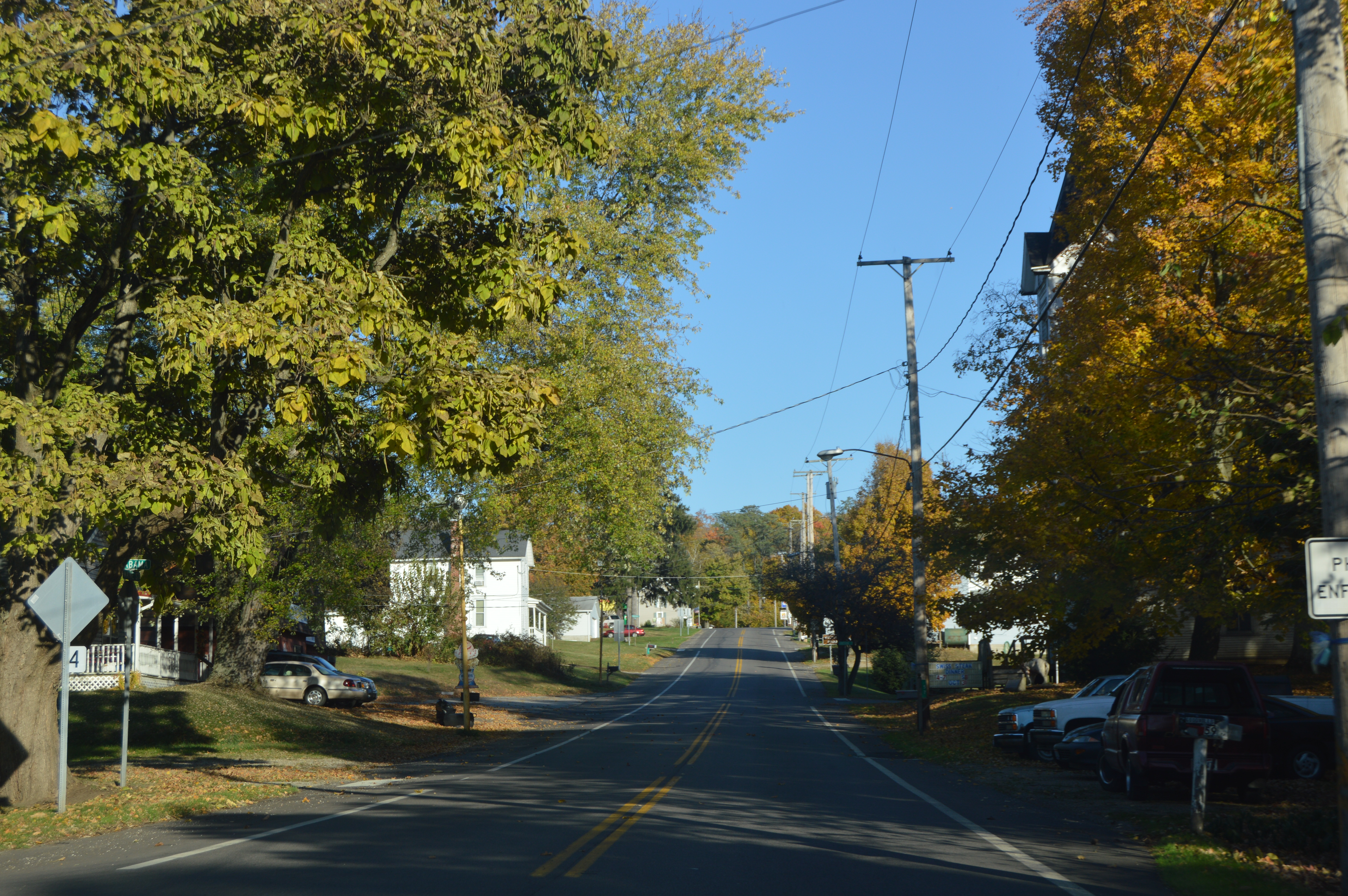
- Maine Street

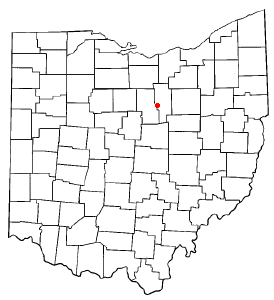
- Location of Mifflin, Ohio

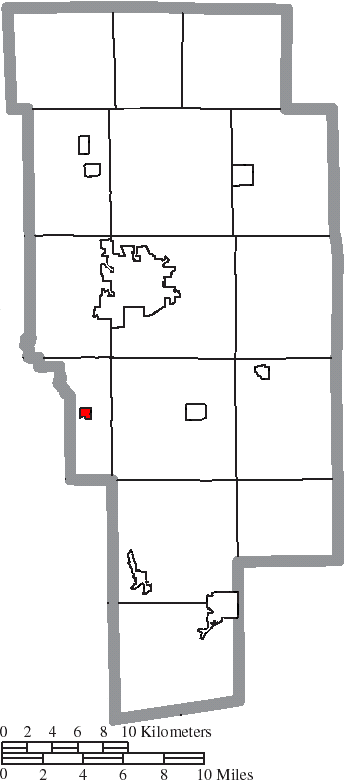
- Location of Mifflin in Ashland County
- Coordinates: 40°46′24″N 82°21′50″W
- Country: United States
- State: Ohio
- County: Ashland
- Township: Mifflin

Area
  - Total: 0.18 sq mi (0.47 km^{2})
  - Land: 0.18 sq mi (0.47 km^{2})
  - Water: 0 sq mi (0.00 km^{2})
- Elevation: 1,066 ft (325 m)

Population (2020)
  - Total: 158
  - Density: 864.6/sq mi (333.82/km^{2})
- Time zone: UTC-5 (Eastern (EST))
  - Summer (DST): UTC-4 (EDT)
- ZIP code: 44805 (Ashland)
- Area code(s): 419 & 567
- FIPS code: 39-50036
- GNIS feature ID: 2399340

Mifflin is a village in Mifflin Township, Ashland County, Ohio, United States. The population was 158 at the 2020 census.

== History ==
Mifflin was originally called Petersburg, and under the latter name was laid out in 1816. A post office called Mifflin was established in 1841, and remained in operation until 1907.

== Geography ==
According to the United States Census Bureau, the village has a total area of 0.18 square miles (0.47 km^{2}), all land.

== Demographics ==
Historical population
Census	Pop.	Note	%±
1880	210		—
1900	185		—
1910	153		−17.3%
1920	133		−13.1%
1930	132		−0.8%
1940	161		22.0%
1950	186		15.5%
1960	216		16.1%
1970	215		−0.5%
1980	203		−5.6%
1990	162		−20.2%
2000	144		−11.1%
2010	137		−4.9%
2020	158		15.3%
U.S. Decennial Census

=== 2010 census ===
As of the census of 2010, there were 137 people, 57 households, and 39 families living in the village. The population density was 761.1 inhabitants per square mile (293.9/km^{2}). There were 61 housing units at an average density of 338.9 per square mile (130.9/km^{2}). The racial makeup of the village was 99.3% White and 0.7% from other races. Hispanic or Latino of any race were 0.7% of the population.

There were 57 households, of which 35.1% had children under the age of 18 living with them, 43.9% were married couples living together, 12.3% had a female householder with no husband present, 12.3% had a male householder with no wife present, and 31.6% were non-families. 28.1% of all households were made up of individuals, and 10.6% had someone living alone who was 65 years of age or older. The average household size was 2.40 and the average family size was 2.82.

The median age in the village was 39.3 years. 25.5% of residents were under the age of 18; 6.6% were between the ages of 18 and 24; 27.8% were from 25 to 44; 24.8% were from 45 to 64; and 15.3% were 65 years of age or older. The gender makeup of the village was 48.2% male and 51.8% female.

=== 2000 census ===
As of the census of 2000, there were 144 people, 64 households, and 36 families living in the village. The population density was 553.3 inhabitants per square mile (213.6/km^{2}). There were 69 housing units at an average density of 265.1 per square mile (102.4/km^{2}). The racial makeup of the village was 99.31% White, and 0.69% Asian.

There were 64 households, out of which 32.8% had children under the age of 18 living with them, 37.5% were married couples living together, 14.1% had a female householder with no husband present, and 42.2% were non-families. 34.4% of all households were made up of individuals, and 15.6% had someone living alone who was 65 years of age or older. The average household size was 2.25 and the average family size was 2.95.

In the village, the population was spread out, with 20.8% under the age of 18, 12.5% from 18 to 24, 31.9% from 25 to 44, 21.5% from 45 to 64, and 13.2% who were 65 years of age or older. The median age was 37 years. For every 100 females there were 97.3 males. For every 100 females age 18 and over, there were 103.6 males.

The median income for a household in the village was $33,250, and the median income for a family was $38,750. Males had a median income of $33,281 versus $21,250 for females. The per capita income for the village was $13,387. There were 8.6% of families and 12.9% of the population living below the poverty line, including 8.7% of under eighteens and 20.0% of those over 64.

== Notable people ==
- Harry B. Hershey, Illinois Supreme Court justice
- Charles Paxton Zaner, calligrapher, died in a car crash here in 1918
