= Rosekrans Hoffman =

American artist and children's book illustrator

- Hoffman in 1981
- Born: Ruth Olive Rosekrans; January 7, 1926; Denton, Nebraska, U.S.
- Died: September 26, 2007 (aged 81); David City, Nebraska, U.S.
- Occupations: Artist, illustrator
- Partner: Robert Hoffman
- Writing career
- Language: English

Ruth Olive Rosekrans Hoffman (7 January 1926 - 26 September 2007) was an American children's book illustrator and painter, known as Rosekrans Hoffman professionally.

== Early life ==
Ruth Olive Rosekrans was born at her parents’ home on 7 January 1926 in Denton, Nebraska. She was the second child of James Charles, a contractor, and Pearl D Rosekrans, née Hocking.

She began drawing at the age of three or four. When she was seven she contracted osteomyelitis, a bone infection only treatable at that time by painful bone drains. She had to stay in a full body cast, with only her arms and hands free, for 18 months. It was during this period that she began to develop her artistic abilities. She began by copying newspaper comic strips from the Lincoln Star newspaper including Tillie the Toiler, Dick Tracy, Mutt and Jeff and Popeye.

She said the experience “gave me a new perspective on life… in bed in the body cast, horizontal, I saw things I wouldn’t ordinarily see. I wasn’t a child looking up, but more like a part of the land. From my prone position, I used to eye my food like an explorer surveying the horizon. Piles of mashed potatoes took on the proportions of mountains against the skyline. Undersides of chins, nostrils, palms jumped out at me. I studied expressions, the details of wallpaper, and tiny hairs peeking out of people’s ears.”

She would spend many more months in partial casts, a wheelchair, and homemade braces that her father invented to enable her to become more mobile. She used a walking stick for the rest of her life.

== Education ==
She recovered sufficiently to attend Denton School District 136, graduating from Denton High School in 1945. She studied art at the University of Nebraska where she was “strongly influenced” by her teacher, the muralist and painter Kady Faulkner. She was a member of Delta Phi Delta, a national art honorary society. She gained a Bachelor of Fine Arts in 1948, after which she took graduate work at Penn State.

== Personal life ==
In 1949 she married Mervyn L Cadwallader in Lancaster, Nebraska. They moved to California so that he could complete his PhD in history at the University of California, Berkeley. She spent her time painting, and studying with Japanese-American painter, photographer and printmaker Yasuo Kuniyoshi. In 1952 they were living on Hall Street, Brooklyn, New York.

By 1955 she and Cadwallader had divorced and she married Robert Hoffman in New York City. They bonded over a shared love of jazz. During this period she wrote “a lot of letters” to the City Council encouraging them to make buildings more accessible. About this endeavor she said, “So many buildings were built without access by ramp or rail for the handicapped. I think it was the feeling of those times that the handicapped should be put away out of sight.” In an interview from 1978 she "takes credit" for initiating a change in the city's views on accessibility.

In the early 1970s they built a home in West Haven, Connecticut which they shared with a pet cat, Boy, who appeared in many of her illustrations.

After Robert's retirement in 1991 they moved to Lincoln, Nebraska where she became active in local community life. She was a member of Denton Community Historical Society (DCHS), and a supporter of the Nebraska Literary Heritage Association, the Junior League of Lincoln, Lincoln City Public Library's Heritage Room and the University Place Art Center (now Lux Center for the Arts).

When Robert died in 1999, she moved to a nursing home in David City, Nebraska.

== Early work ==
She held several art-related jobs before becoming a full-time illustrator of children's books. She worked as an artist for Balco Research Inc. in Newark, New Jersey, in New York's City Planning Office and for Addison Wesley Publishing Co.

Her paintings were exhibited at the Whitney Museum and the Brooklyn Museum. She stopped painting around 1972 to focus on drawing. One reason for the change was the physical exertion required to stand for long periods.

== Full time artist ==
She became a full time artist in 1972, working under the name Rosekrans Hoffman, because “it’s simpler”. Her agent was Helen Wohlberg of Kirchoff/Wohlberg Inc. New York.

Hoffman was always careful to say that she was an artist, and not an illustrator. To her, this meant that the integrity of her artistic vision came first. She spent little time looking at others’ books for children, and whenever she illustrated a book, she favoured the usual publishers’ practice of keeping the author and illustrator completely separate until the launch.

Her work was influenced by her childhood in Nebraska, and the Dust Bowl of the early 1930s. ‘Washed-out’ shades tended to dominate her illustrations – dusty browns, mauves, ochres and dying yellows; she called them “old world” colours. Her characters were described as “peculiar, unique and slightly out-of-proportion, but never cute.” Of her style, she said “I work primarily with ink on fine pen points and turn corners where I have never been.”

She advised two-term US Poet Laureate Ted Kooser on his first children's book Bag in the Wind (finally published 2010) after it received a “lukewarm” reception from children's book publishers. Her advice was to remove much of Kooser's descriptive text, and leave it to the illustrator to create the imagery.

=== Collections and exhibitions ===
Her work is in the following collections

- Heritage Room, Lincoln Public Library, Nebraska
- Joslyn Art Museum, Omaha
- Museum of Nebraska Art, Kearney
- Whitney Museum of American Art, New York City, New York
- Brooklyn Museum, Brooklyn, New York
- Kerlan Collection, University of Minnesota

Her work was exhibited in the following venues:

- Haydon Art Center, Lincoln, Nebraska
- Sheldon Memorial Art Gallery, Nebraska
- New York City Center Gallery, New York
- Bennett Martin Public Library, Nebraska
- Elder Gallery, Nebraska Wesleyan University
- University Place Art Center (Lux Center for the Arts), Lincoln, Nebraska

== Publications ==
=== Author and Illustrator ===
- Anna Banana (1975)
- Sweet Sister Ella (1982)

=== Illustrator ===
- Walter in Love (1973) by Alicen White ISBN 0688500404
- Where Did That Naughty Little Hamster Go? (1974) by Patty Wolcott ISBN 0201142457
- Alexandra the Rock Eater: An Old Rumanian Tale Retold (1978) by Dorothy Van Woerkom – nominated for a Caldecott Medal ISBN 0201142457
- An Egg Is To Sit On (1978) by Christine Tanz ISBN 0688518117
- My Mother Sends Her Wisdom (1979) by Louise McClenathan ISBN 0688221939
- Go to Bed! A Book of Bedtime Poems (1979) by Lee Bennett Hopkins ISBN 0394938690
- Elves, Fairies & Gnomes: Poems (1980) selected by Lee Bennett Hopkins ISBN 0394943511
- Come Home, Wilma (1980) by Mitchell Sharmat ISBN 0807512788
- The Case of the Missing Hat: Starring Jim Henson’s Muppet's (1982) by Greg Williams ISBN 0394851048
- The Easter Pig (1982) by Louise McClenathan ISBN 0688014461
- The Truth About the Moon (1983) by Clayton Bess ISBN 0395643716
- How Do You Make an Elephant Float? And Other Delicious Riddles (1983) by Lee Bennett Hopkins ISBN 0807534153
- Creepy, Crawly Critter Riddles (1986) by Joanne E. Bernstein and Paul Cohen Whitman ISBN 0807513458
- Three Sisters (1986) by Audrey Wood ISBN 0803705972
- The Horrible Holidays (1988) by Audrey Wood ISBN 0803705468
- Sue Patch and the Crazy Clocks (1989) by Ann Tompert ISBN 0803706561
- Jet Black Pick-Up Truck (1990) by Pat Lakin ISBN 0531058859
- The Best Cat Suit of All (1991) by Sylvia Cassedy ISBN 0803705166
- Jane Yolen’s Mother Goose Songbook (1992) by Jane Yolen, musical arrangements Adam Stemple ISBN 1878093525
- Where Do Little Girls Grow? (1993) by Milly Jane Limmer ISBN 0807589241
- Jane Yolen’s Old MacDonald Songbook (1994) by Jane Yolen ISBN 1563972816
- Another New Day (1995) by Brian Potter and Wayne Green ISBN 0964552906
- Pignic: An Alphabet in Rhyme (1996) by Anne Miranda ISBN 1563975580
- Mr Wink (1996) by Claire Daniel and Elfrieda H. Hiebert ISBN 0813607825
- Delilah Drinkwater and the Clever Cloud (1997) by Marcia Vaughan ISBN 0813607825

=== Textbooks ===
Hoffman produced many textbook illustrations “because texts make more money.” She worked with publishers including Houghton Mifflin, McGraw Hill Education, Open Court, Scholastic and Zaner-Bloser.

=== Other ===
She created a Christmas card each year, many of which are stored in the History Nebraska collection, in Lincoln, Nebraska. She also designed a poster for New York's Children's Book Council Anytime, Anyplace, Any Book campaign in 1981.

== Awards and honours ==
- Caldecott Medal nominee for Alexandra the Rock Eater (1978)
- Established Pearl Rosekrans Memorial Scholarship in honour of her mother, awarded to an art student at Nebraska Wesleyan University (1978)
- Society of Illustrators member for Come Home, Wilma (1980)
- The Nebraska Literary Heritage Association sponsored a dinner honouring Hoffman in the Rotunda of the Nebraska State Capitol (1983)
- Outstanding Alumni Achievement Award in Art (1999) by UNL College of Fine Art, Nebraska
