= Haemi Balgassi =

Korean American writer

- Born: 1967 (age 58–59); Seoul, South Korea
- Occupation: Author
- Writing career
- Genres: Children's literature, Young adult literature

Haemi Balgassi (born 1967) is a Korean American writer. She is the author of award-winning children's books including Peacebound Trains and Tae's Sonata.

Balgassi was born in Seoul, South Korea, and grew up in Western Massachusetts. Her stories, articles, essays, and poetry have been published in numerous publications, including Cicada, Hopscotch, Liquorian, Complete Woman, romance magazines, and literary journals. Balgassi was one of 45 authors and illustrators featured in Children's Authors and Illustrators Too Good to Miss, a reference book by Sharron L. McElmeel.

== Books ==
Balgassi's chapter book Peacebound Trains was illustrated by Chris Soentpiet and published by Clarion Books in 1997. It is a story about life in Seoul at the time of the Korean War, recounted by a character called Grandmother to her granddaughter Sumi. Peacebound Trains is based on the real-life experiences of Balgassi's mother. It was named a Smithsonian (magazine) Notable Children's Book, International Reading Association Notable Book for a Global Society, San Francisco Chronicle Best Children's Book, Society of Illustrators Gold Medalist, National Council for the Social Studies/Children's Book Council Notable Children's Trade Book in the Field of Social Studies, and American Booksellers Association Pick of the Lists. Peacebound Trains was featured on the United States of America Korean War Commemoration site, complete with a Teacher Activity Guide. It is the only book to receive this honor. In 2014, NPR included "All Aboard! A Reading List for the Rails.

Balgassi's middle-grade novel, Tae's Sonata, was published by Clarion Books in 1997. It tells the story of a Korean-American eighth-grader grappling with her identity as a first-generation immigrant in the United States. The book weaves together Tae's experiences of prejudice and discrimination against her family with her own coming-of-age and first crush. Tae's Sonata was named a National Council for the Social Studies/Children's Book Council Notable Children's Trade Book in the Field of Social Studies, an American Booksellers Association Pick of the Lists, and nominated for the Maine Student Book Award. The novel won the 2000 Lamplighter Classic Award. Bank Street College honored Best Children's Book. Children's 2006, Hampton-Brown, a branch of National Geographic School Publishing, selected Tae's Sonata for its inZone Books collection.

== Interviews ==
- DebbiMichikoFlorence.com: "An Interview with Children's Writer Haemi Balgassi"
- CynthiaLeitichSmith.com: "Interview with Children's and YA Author Haemi Balgassi"
- papertigers.org: "Interview with Korean American Author, Haemi Balgassi"
- Commitment Magazine: "Inspired to Write Stories for Children"
