= McElderry =

McElderry is a surname. McElderry was originally spelled Macelderry. Mac means son in Gaelic. Some families also dropped an r, such as McEldery.

Notable people with the surname include:

- Jim McElderry, American soccer player and coach
- Joe McElderry (born 1991), English singer-songwriter

== See also ==
- McElderry Park, Baltimore
