= Philip Stanton =

Philip Stanton (born 1962) is an American artist and author based in Barcelona, Spain, director of the design group Stanton Studio, whose works include multimedia design projects and urban installations. He is also the author and illustrator of children's books published in Europe and the United States.

== Biography ==
=== Barcelona ===
Since 1988 Stanton has participated in more than 60 solo and group exhibitions and has collaborated with newspapers and magazines (his covers for the cultural section of Barcelona newspaper La Vanguardia were awarded prizes by the ADGFAD and included in the 1992 European Illustration/Illustration Now annual), as well as with a number of Spanish and international companies.

His work has received a number of design and illustration awards in Spain including: 12 Laus awards, the Apel.les Mestres prize for children's literature and the Junceda illustration prize from the Catalan professional illustrator's association APIC. Internationally his work has won awards or been included for publication in the Cresta Awards, the British Design and Art Direction Annual, and the Type Directors Club annual.

Stanton is also head of the postgraduate illustration program and professor of illustration at the EINA Art & Design School in Barcelona.

=== Notable works ===
He is the author of a number of urban installations including: Palau Robert (1997–98), l'Aquàrium de Barcelona (1998), the inauguration ceremony of the European cup final (1999) in Barcelona, the set design of the internacional concert tour "Serrat-Tarrés" of Joan Manuel Serrat (2000), The construction wall during the building of the Agbar tower of architect Jean Nouvel (2001), the decoration of the Sagrada Família subway station (2002), the facade of PG45 (2006) and the parade floats of the holiday parade “Cabalgata de reyes” (2007) of the Barcelona city government.

=== Children's book author and illustrator ===
As an illustrator of books for children and adults he has published more than 40 titles including collaborations with authors Emili Teixidor, Jordi Sierra i Fabra, Ray Bradbury, Lee Bennett Hopkins, J. Patrick Lewis, Naguib Mahfouz, Juan Carlos Martín Ramos, Tomàs Garcés and Jorge Zentner. He is the author and illustrator of “La Gata Misha”, a series of children's books published in Spain by Grupo SM.

His work has been published and translated into English, Spanish, French, Dutch, Catalan, and Italian.

== Bibliography ==
=== Author and illustrator ===
- ¿Cómo te encuentras? Ed. Casterman, 1995, Spain
- Com et trobes? Ed. Casterman, 1995, Spain
- Comment te sents-tu? Ed. Casterman, 1995, France
- Hoe voel je je? Ed. Casterman, 1995, Holland
- ¿Sonidos o ruidos? Norma Editorial, 1995, Spain
- ¿Sons o sorolls? Norma Editorial, 1995, Spain
- Jolis sons ou villains bruits? Ed. Casterman, 1995, France
- Wat voor geluid maakt het? Ed. Casterman, 1995, Holland
- ¡No quiero ser violeta! from the collection “Misha, la gata violeta” Grupo SM, 2006, Spain
- ¡Hoy no voy al cole! from the collection “Misha, la gata violeta” Grupo SM, 2006, Spain
- Es mío, ¡devuélvemelo! from the collection “Misha, la gata violeta” Grupo SM, 2006, Spain
- ¡No tengo sueño! from the collection “Misha, la gata violeta” Grupo SM, 2006, Spain
- El dentista es un monstruo, from the collection “Misha, la gata violeta” Grupo SM, 2007, Spain
- Un hermano, ¿para qué?, from the collection “Misha, la gata violeta” Grupo SM, 2007, Spain
- No vull ser violeta! de la colección “Misha, la gateta violeta” Ed. Baula, 2009, España
- És meu, Torna-m’ho! de la colección “Misha, la gateta violeta” Ed. Baula, 2009, España
- Avui no aniré a l’escola! de la colección “Misha, la gateta violeta” Ed. Baula, 2009, España
- No Tinc Son! de la colección “Misha, la gateta violeta” Ed. Baula, 2009, España
- El dentista és un monstre! de la colección “Misha, la gateta violeta” Ed. Baula, 2009, España
- Un germanet, per a què? de la colección “Misha, la gateta violeta” Ed. Baula, 2009, España

=== Illustrator ===
- Barcelona, la ciudad de los niños. Ediciones Pau S.L., 1995, Spain
- Las noches de las mil y una noches. Círculo de Lectores, 1997, Spain
- Aigua. Consorci de l’Auditori i l’Orquestra, 2003, Spain
- Ring 1-2-3 y el mundo nuevo. Apel·les Mestres Prize Editorial Planeta, S.A., 2003, Spain
- En Ring 1-2-3 i el món nou. Apel·les Mestres Prize Editorial Planeta, S.A., 2003, Spain
- Cócteles Ilustrados. Blur ediciones, 2004, Spain
- Poemamundi. Grupo Anaya, 2004, Spain
- En Ring 1-2-3 i el món nou. (paperback) Planeta & Oxford, 2005, Spain
- Intercanvi. Perspectiva Editorial Cultural, S.A. - Aura Comunicació, 2005, Spain
- Got Geography!. Greenwillow Books, an imprint of HarperCollins, 2006, USA
- Cançó de Sega. Ed. Cruïlla, 2006, Spain
- En Ring 1-2-3 i la Lupa. Planeta & Oxford, 2007, Spain
- La Casa Vella. Editorial Planeta, 2007, Spain
- La Casa Vieja. Editorial Planeta, 2007, Spain
- Blind. Editorial Easy Readers, 2008, Dinamarca
- A la Tierra le ha salido una gotera. Grupo SM, 2008, España
- La Terra té una gotera. Grupo SM, 2008, España
- La cuina del Català de l´any. Editorial Primera Plana, 2008 España
- Chuf Chuf. Editorial Macmillan, 2009, España
- Txuf Txuf. Editorial Macmillan, 2009, España
- Gotas de colores. Editorial Satélite K, 2009, España
- Gotes de colors. Editorial Satélite K, 2009, España
- Josete y Bongo van de safari, 2010 Macmillan infantil. España

=== Covers and contributions ===
- Entre amigas. Ediciones Destino, 1999, Spain
- En la soledad del alba. Sopec Editorial, 1999, Spain
- Mis primeras 80.000 palabras. Media Vaca, 2002, Spain
- El topo a la luz del día. El Aleph, 2003, Spain

== Honors and awards ==
- 1984 Sullivan Scholarship, Rollins College
- 1984 Orlando Advertising Foundation (OAF) Scholarship
- 1985 Orlando Advertising Foundation (OAF) Scholarship
- 1984 Who´s Who in American Colleges and Universities
- 1985 Who´s Who in American Colleges and Universities
- 1985 Albin C. Polasek Foundation Scholarship
- 1985 Cornell Foundation Scholarship
- 1985 Fishbach Foundation Scholarship
- 1986 Scripps Howard Newspaper Foundation Scholarship
- 1987 Fred C. Koch Foundation Scholarship
- 1987 Winter Park Community Trust Fund Scholarship
- 1987 MFA Leslie T. Posey Foundation Scholarship,
- 1987 Award of Merit, CES Packaging Design Exposition, New York
- 1989 British Design and Art Direction Annual, London
- 1990 LAUS/ADGFAD Design Prizes: 3 bronze awards
- 1990 European Illustration/Illustration Now Juried Annual, 8 pages selected
- 1991 LAUS/ADGFAD Design Prizes: 1 silver award,2 bronzes
- 1992 LAUS/ADGFAD Design Prizes: 1 silver award,
- 1993 LAUS/ADGFAD Design Prizes: Trophy “Alimentario”
- 1993 LAUS/ADGFAD Design Prizes: 1 silver award,1 bronze award
- 1994 Cresta Awards: Finalist, New York
- 1994 Typography 15, Type Director´s Club, New York
- 1994 LAUS/ADGFAD Design Prizes: 1 silver award
- 1995 LAUS/ADGFAD Design Prizes: 1 silver award
- 1996 Barcelona City Government Design Prizes: 1 gold award
- 1998 Centenary poster del Real Club de Tenis de Barcelona
- 2001 poster for XX Aniversario de la "Setmana del Cava"
- 2002 Finalist nacional Poster "Marc Martí"
- 2002 Plata Premios "Best Pack"
- 2003 XXIII Premio Destino Apel.les Mestres por “Ring 1-2-3 y el mundo nuevo”
- 2005 Junceda Illustration Prizes APIC, Barcelona

== Sources ==
=== Books ===
- Various authors. "El pols dels dies. 125 anys de La Vanguardia," Daniel Giralt Miracle (author sección de ilustración), Barcelona: La Vanguardia, 2006. Pag. 106 y 107
- Ignasi Vich. "World’s sign selection," Barcelona: Index Book, 2002. Pag. 95, 107, 143
- Ramón Ubeda y Cristina Diaz. "Terminal B. Vol. I," Barcelona; FAD (Foment de les arts Decoratives), 2007. Pag. 360–361
- Daniel Giralt Miracle. "Dibuixants, humoristes i il·lustradors de La Vanguardia 1881-2006," Barcelona: Fundació Caixa Girona, 2006. Pag. 147
- James Henry Mann Jr, Nicolas Lampert, Raquel Pelta, Nadxieli Mannello. "Carteles contra una guerra. Signos por la paz," Barcelona: Editorial Gustavo Gili, 2003
- Various authors. "Retrat de Barcelona. Vol II," Carles Prats (author sección de “Una Nova visió global”) Barcelona: Centre de Cultura Contemporània de Barcelona, 1995 Pag. 158–159
- Àngels Manzano, Ramón Úbeda, Maichael Bahr, Cristina Díaz. "Pez de Plata. Barcelona. Ciudad, creación, color," Barcelona: BMW Ibérica, 2006. Pag. 68–69
- Various authors. "Nessuno uniforme. Grafica contro la guerra," Milano: AIAP Assoziazione Italiana Progettazione per la Comunicazione Visiva, 2003. Pag. 19, 34 and 35.

=== Press ===
- Tomás Hornos. “Ilustrar una atmósfera, el tono, sugerir interpretaciones." Artegráfica Nº 10 (febrero 2005), p. 6-22
- Carlos Díaz. “Stanton Studio. Creación sin etiquetas”. Visual Nº 96 (2004) p. 116-122,
- Emili Teixidor. “Philip Stanton. Diario visual” Suplemento Culturas, La Vanguardia 21 June 2004, p. 12-13
- Antoni Mañach Moreno. “Philip Stanton” Revista Codig nº 72 (2003) p. 6 – 11
- Richard Schweid. “An exuberant cubist” Barcelona Metropolitan nº 64 (mayo 2002). p. 12-14
- Philip Stanton. “Cuadernos de Bolonia” CLIJ Cuadernos de Literatura Infantil y Juvenil Nº 18 (marzo 2005) p. 56-59
- Philip Stanton, “Autorretrato” CLIJ Cuadernos de Literatura Infantil y Juvenil Nº 169 (marzo 2004) p. 41-43
- Ricardo Nuno, “Interview with Philip Stanton”, (on-line) Barceloca.com (July 19, 2002)
