= Zaner-Bloser (company) =

American English education company

Zaner-Bloser, Inc.
- Formerly: Zanerian Art College Co., Zaner & Bloser Co., Zaner-Bloser Co.
- Founded: 1888
- Founder: Charles Paxton Zaner
- Headquarters: Columbus, Ohio, USA
- Services: Handwriting, reading, writing, spelling, and vocabulary programs
- Parent: Highlights for Children
- Website: www.zaner-bloser.com

Zaner-Bloser, Inc., is a company headquartered in Columbus, Ohio, which publishes handwriting, reading, writing, spelling, and vocabulary programs.

== History ==
=== Zanerian College of Penmanship ===
The Zanerian Art College Co. was founded in Columbus, Ohio by Charles Paxton Zaner in 1888. Zaner’s education in the pen arts and enthusiasm for teaching inspired him to open a school that would prepare students to write, draw, and teach in the penmanship industry.

The Zanerian Art College offered both Diploma courses aimed at producing professional penmanship teachers as well as Certificate courses aimed at producing pen art specialists. The graduates of these programs often continued on to be influential American penmen in their own right, granting the Zanerian a reputation for excellence. Notable students of the Zanerian Art College have included the likes of E. A. Lupfer, W. A. Baird, C. W. Norder, and other well-known American penmen.

=== Later years ===
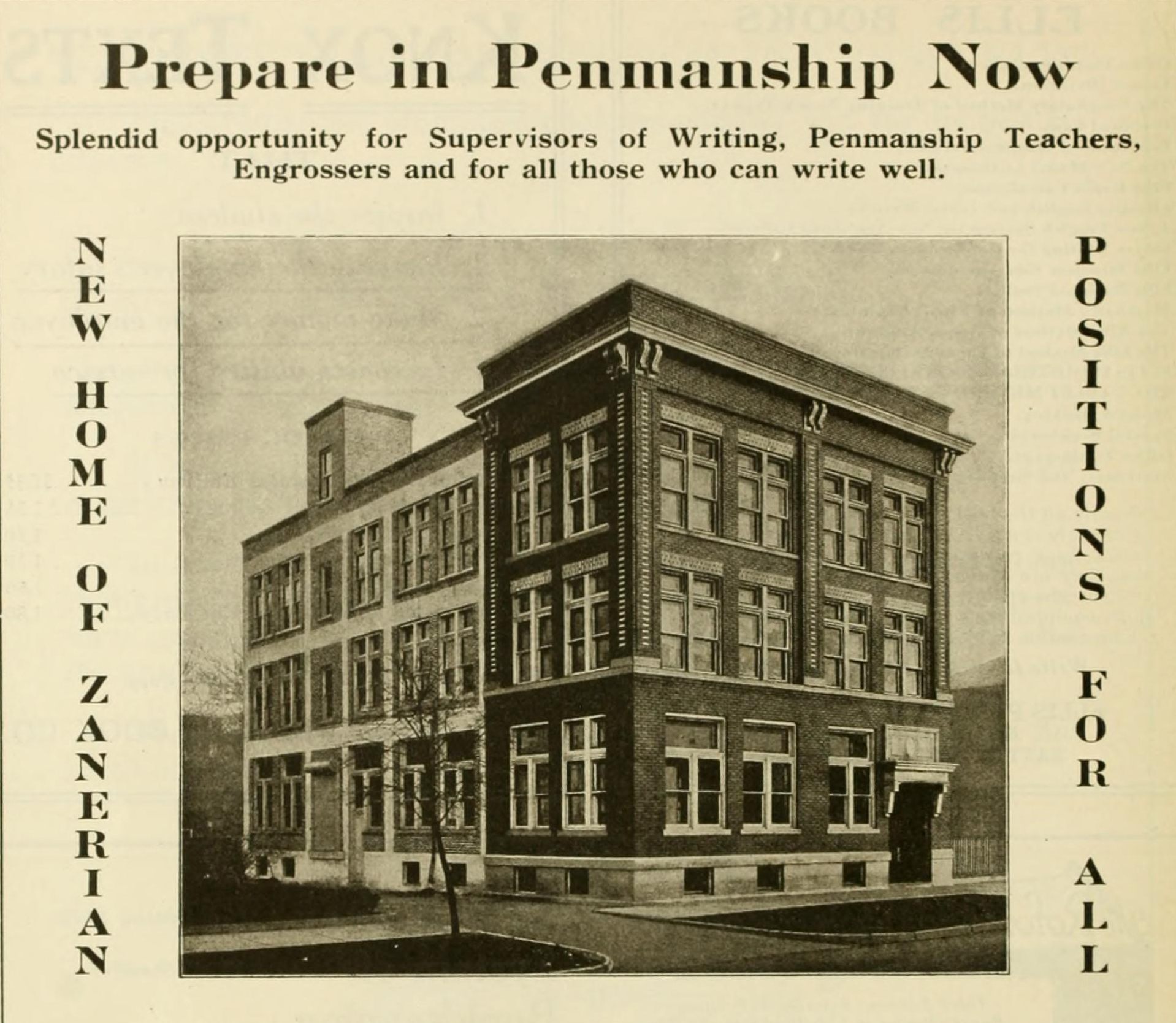
The Zanerian College

After building a reputation as an institution where students could specialize in various branches of pen art, the Zanerian Art College established itself as a leading voice in American penmanship by the early-20th century through the development of its own distinctive teaching script and the publication of quarterly, bi-monthly, then monthly periodicals pertaining to the penmanship industry.

The Zanerian Exponent (1895), an industry journal containing endorsements from previous students, specimens of penmanship, lessons in writing, and industry news, would become The Penman and Artist (1887), The Penman-Artist and Business Educator (1900), The Business Educator (1902), and The Educator (1932).

=== Name Changes ===
- In 1891, Zaner's former classmate and friend Elmer W. Bloser purchased an interest in the company. By 1896, works bear the name "Zaner & Bloser Company".
- In 1921, the ampersand was replaced with a hyphen resulting in "Zaner-Bloser Co."

=== Acquisition ===
In 1972, Zaner-Bloser, Inc. became a wholly owned subsidiary of Highlights for Children.

== Contributors ==
=== Charles Paxton Zaner ===
Charles Paxton Zaner

Charles Paxton Zaner (1864–1918) was born on a farm near Bloomsburg, Pennsylvania. After showing a fondness for penmanship in his youth, Zaner enrolled in G. W. Michael's National Pen Art Hall and Business College in Oberlin, Ohio in 1883 to pursue an education in penmanship. He then taught penmanship in both Delaware, Ohio and Columbus, Ohio for several years before opening The Zanerian College in 1888.

In 1889, fellow penman Lloyd Kelchner became a partner with Zaner. Two years later, Elmer Ward Bloser—a former classmate and fellow penman—joined the partnership. That same year, Kelchner left the business arrangement, leading Zaner and Bloser to become equal partners in what had then become the Zaner & Bloser Company.

=== Elmer Ward Bloser ===
Elmer Ward Bloser (1865–1929) was raised on his parents’ farm in Pennsylvania. His interest in writing was apparent even as a child, when he sold writing inks and supplies to neighborhood children. In 1883, Bloser began attending G.W. Michael’s Pen Art Hall, where his writing acumen eventually earned him a position as penmanship instructor.

Bloser’s penmanship career advanced with such success that he was considered one of the finest in the industry. In 1891, he purchased shares of the Zanerian Art College Co., which later became the Zaner-Bloser Company. After Charles Paxton Zaner's untimely death in 1918, Bloser purchased the company’s remaining shares, and continued to manage Zaner-Bloser’s successful operation until his own death in 1929.

== See also ==
- Zaner-Bloser (teaching script)
- Penmanship
- Handwriting
