= Highlights (magazine) =

American children's magazine

Highlights for Children

- June 2021 cover highlighting the magazine's 75th anniversary
- Editor: Christine French Cully
- Frequency: Monthly
- First issue: June 1946; 80 years ago
- Company: Highlights for Children, Inc.
- Country: United States
- Based in: Business: Columbus, Ohio Editorial: Honesdale, Pennsylvania
- Language: English
- Website: Official website
- ISSN: 0018-165X

Highlights for Children, often referred to simply as Highlights, is an American children's magazine. It was started in June 1946 by educators Garry Cleveland Myers and Caroline Clark Myers in Honesdale, Pennsylvania. They worked at a children's magazine, Children's Activities for 12 years before leaving to begin Highlights. Highlights tagline is "Fun with a Purpose".

Editorial offices are in Honesdale and business operations are based in Columbus, Ohio. The company owns several subsidiaries including book publisher Zaner-Bloser. Highlights surpassed a billion magazine copies in 2006. Highlights, High Five, High Five Bilingüe, Highlights CoComelon, Hello, and brainPLAY magazines do not carry third-party advertising or commercial messages.

== Company history ==
Garry Myers earned a PhD degree in psychology from Columbia University in Manhattan, New York before World War I, providing a basis for teaching he would do the rest of his life. He and Caroline Myers taught illiterate soldiers for the U.S. Army. Caroline was the first female teacher employed by the Army. The experience led to them being pioneers in elementary education. They taught educators and parents for a time at Case Western Reserve University in Cleveland, Ohio. In 1928, Garry started writing a nationally syndicated column entitled Parent Problems, which continued for 50 years. The couple also co-authored several books.

From the late 1920s to the mid-1930s, the Myers helped to develop a number of parenting publications, becoming nationally well known in education. They served as editors for Children's Activities. From 1941 to 1946, the two toured the U.S., lecturing, writing articles, and publishing books. After ending their relationship with Children's Activities, they started their own magazine. Later, they bought Children's Activities and incorporated it in Highlights.

Highlights for Children began publication in June 1946, with Garry Myers serving as editor-in-chief. An editorial office was set up in Honesdale, Pennsylvania and a business office was established near their printer in Columbus, Ohio. After seeing the amount of advertisements in Children's Activities, the Myers decided that their magazine would not have paid ads. The first issue had 20,000 copies printed, but sales were lower than expected. Within six months, the magazine was losing money and the founders asked their son Garry Myers, Jr. to work with them to wind it down. Recognizing its potential, he concluded that it was worth saving and came up with the idea of placing copies with doctors' and dentists' offices throughout North America. That turned the magazine's fortunes around.

On December 16, 1960, Myers, Jr., his wife Mary, and company vice-president Cyril Ewart were killed in a mid-air collision which left 134 dead. The three were traveling to discuss distribution plans for Highlights. They were replaced on the board of directors by members of the Myers family. Dick Bell was promoted to company president in 1962. Garry Cleveland Myers died in 1971 and Walter Barbe took over as the editor-in-chief. In 1972, Zaner-Bloser became a wholly owned subsidiary of Highlights for Kids. Bell was also named CEO in 1980, before transitioning to being the chairman in 1981. Garry Myers III was named the CEO. At the time, the company had become a diversified educational-publishing enterprise with $21 million a year in gross revenues. Its subsidiaries included Essential Learning Products, the Zaner-Bloser Company, and the quarterly Newsletter of Parenting with a circulation of 15,000.

Kent Brown Jr., a grandson of Gary and Caroline Myers, took over as editor-in-chief in 1989. The company expanded its operations in the 1990s. It founded Boyds Mill Press in 1990 to focus on trade books for children. In 1991, the company acquired Staff Development for Educators, which provides continuing education for teachers. Stenhouse Publishing, established in 1993, produces research-driven professional development books for educators.

The company moved to its Columbus headquarters in 2000. Myers III remained as CEO until his sudden death in 2005. He was replaced by Kent Johnson Jr., a great-grandson of Garry and Caroline Myers. Under Johnson, the company has grown its print, digital, and specialty offerings. In April 2013, Highlights began publishing issues in India. That included Highlights Champs, for children ages 6 to 12, and Highlights Genies, for children ages 2 to 6. By October, international versions of Highlights and High Five were made available in Australia, South Africa, Taiwan, and Chile.

In January 2018, the company merged its Staff Development for Educators and Stenhouse operations. In May 2019, Highlights for Children sold Its Boyds Mills Press division, including its Calkins Creek and WordSong imprints, to Kane Press in 2019. The Highlights Press and Highlights Learning imprints were not included in the sale. In June 2023, Highlights for Children acquired Tinkergarten, a company that provides research-backed, play-based outdoor learning experiences to children six months to 8 years of age. The company quietly sold Stenhouse to Taylor & Francis in July 2023.

== Highlights ==
Highlights previously focused on developing the reading and thinking skills of 3- to 12-year-olds. However, with the release of subsequent magazines, it is geared mainly to elementary school students; it contains stories and puzzles for children ages six to twelve years old.

In 1954, the Highlights for Children cover changed to feature a design by Munro Leaf. The magazine introduced its familiar "smiling H" logo in 1957. Circulation first reached one million subscribers in 1971. By the 1980s, Highlights was the most popular children's magazine in the United States, having close to two million subscribers, with 95 percent of the copies mailed to homes. The magazine accepted no advertising and eschewed single-issue sales, but could be found in most pediatrician’s and dentist's waiting rooms in North America. By 1981, the magazine mailed 1,250,000 issues 11 months out of the year. In January 1981, after 35 years, the magazine changed its cover to a new six-color, illustrated format. By 1995, Highlights' circulation had grown to 2.8 million, with most subscribers still being families.

Actor Henry Winkler wrote an article discussing his experience overcoming dyslexia in a 2005 issue of the magazine. In 2006, the United States Postal Service delivered the one-billionth copy of Highlights magazine to a young subscriber in Dallas. Highlights' illustrations feature people of all colors and its stories also cover diverse communities. Its February 2017 issue included a family with two dads, the first depiction of a same-sex relationship in the magazine's 70-year history. By March, same-sex couples were also depicted in High-Five and Hello.

The magazine is now offered in many languages including Korean, Chinese, Malay, Polish, Czech, Russian, Greek, French, Turkish, Portuguese, Thai, and Hungarian. The company donated Highlights archives to Ohio State University in Columbus. At the time, 1,200 boxes of back issues and Dear Highlights letters were being kept in a Honesdale barn.

=== Regular features ===
==== Ask Arizona ====
Appearing in the magazine since 2005, "Ask Arizona" is a story series featuring a girl named Arizona who writes an advice column for other children, similar to Dear Abby or Ask Ann Landers. The article depicts real-life experiences and appears in every issue.

==== Hidden Pictures ====
"Hidden Pictures" has appeared in every issue of Highlights since the magazine's inception. Children are asked to find small hidden images within a larger picture.

==== Goofus and Gallant ====
A Goofus and Gallant from October 1980

First appearing in Highlights in 1948, Goofus and Gallant is a "brazenly didactic" cartoon strip, as the New Yorker calls it featuring two contrasting boys, Goofus and Gallant. Created by Garry Cleveland Myers, the boys were originally drawn as elves and originated from an earlier version of the strip called "The G-Twins" at the magazine Children's Activities.

It is shown in the cartoon how each boy would respond to the same situation. Goofus chooses an irresponsible, immature, and unkind path, while Gallant chooses a responsible, mature, and kind path. Often the panels provide a description, such as on a school bus: Goofus hogs his seat – Gallant makes space for someone else to sit down. Sometimes the situations show the boys talking using phone courtesy when parents are away: Goofus: "Someone called but I forgot their name." Gallant: "Someone called for you. I wrote down their name and number."

Goofus and Gallant's primary function is to teach children basic social skills. Originally drawn in black and white, Goofus and Gallant changed to art in colored pencils in 1994 and to colored computer graphics in December 2005. In 2004, the magazine introduced "Gallant Kids," a feature showing children who perform good deeds in their community.

==== The Timbertoes ====
First appearing in 1951, The Timbertoes features a family of wooden puppets.

==== Check and Double Check ====
The feature "Check...and Double Check" asks kids to examine two images and spot the differences.

==== What's Wrong? ====
Featured on the back cover, "What's Wrong?" is a large drawing of a typical scene of children playing, but unusual objects take the place of normal things throughout the picture. The page instructs the reader to find the various objects that are wrong.

==== Brain Play ====
The "Brain Play" section of the magazine comprises a list of several simple questions for children to answer.

==== Dear Highlights ====
"Dear Highlights" is an advice column from real children appearing at the back of each issue. Highlights editors write back to every child who writes to them. Since 1946, the magazine has received over two million letters. In 2021, for the 75th anniversary of Highlights for Children, the company published Dear Highlights: What Adults Can Learn from 75 Years of Letters and Conversations with Kids, a collection of 300 pages of Dear Highlights letters and the answers that were sent back.

==== Other features ====
Highlights also features jokes, riddles, puzzles, short stories, poems, recipes, and craft projects throughout each issue. A puzzle is always featured at the front side of the back cover. "About You" is a section from real children, telling about their favorite hobbies and things.

"Create" is a feature that prints drawings, poems, and stories by readers who submit them to the magazine. Highlights also runs contests asking kids to submit stories to the magazine. They may be asked to complete an unfinished story or submit a short story based on an illustration. Several ideas would be chosen as winners and featured in a future issue.

=== Former features ===
==== Aloysius ====
The Aloysius stories were written by Sydney K. Davis. They centralized on an anthropomorphic wolf named Aloysius, who would get into a situation and have to be rescued by the other characters in the story, a male named Samuel Samuel and a female named Wanda. These stories began in 1951 and appeared until 1993.

==== The Bear Family ====
The Bear Family is a cartoon created by Garry Cleveland Myers. It focuses on a family of bears consisting of Father Bear, Mother Bear, daughter Woozy, and sons Poozy and Piddy. The young bears learn about everything from name-calling to discipline. The comic appeared from the beginning until 1989, and again from 1998 to 2012.

==== Your Best Self ====
"Your Best Self" is a one-panel comic that appeared until June 2015 showing kids doing the right thing.

== Highlights High Five ==
Highlights High Five is a younger children's counterpart to Highlights, first published with the January 2007 issue. The children's magazine is for preschoolers ages two through five. The goal of High Five is to help children develop and to give parent and child a fun and meaningful activity to do together each month. Every issue is 40 pages and includes poems and stories, crafts, easy recipes, games, puzzles, and other activities encouraging children to be lifelong learners.

In July 2008, Highlights for Children launched a Korean edition of Highlights High Five published under the title Hello Friend. In 2014, the company launched High Five Bilingüe for English and Spanish speakers.

== Highlights Hello ==
Highlights Hello magazine

Highlights Hello was introduced in December 2012. The magazine is designed to create bonding time between babies and toddlers and their caregivers. Highlights Hello's target audience is children ages 0–2 years old. Highlights says that the magazine, which is offered in several subscription packages is designed specifically for babies and includes safety features like rounded edges, tear-resistant pages, and moisture-resistant pages with stitched (not stapled) binding. The pages are easy to wipe clean.

== brainPLAY magazine ==
Highlights released a new all-puzzle magazine in June 2023. brainPLAY is a 32-page monthly magazine full of puzzles for kids 7 and older. Hidden Pictures puzzles, logic puzzles, sudoku, crosswords, mazes are featured in the magazine.

== Highlights CoComelon mini magazine ==
Highlights CoComelon mini magazine is a co-branded magazine partnership between Highlights for Children and Moonbug Entertainment, the company behind the popular CoComelon YouTube channel. Debuting in August 2024, the magazine is for kids 1-4 and pairs CoComelon songs and characters with Highlights' classic stories, poems, puzzles, activities, and games.

== Digital initiatives ==
In 1996, to celebrate the magazine's 50th anniversary, a CD-ROM game titled Highlights Interactive was released featuring games based the magazine's then-current features. A spin-off game, Highlights Hidden Pictures Workshop followed in 1997. The magazine's website was launched in 2001. In 2010, Highlights released a series of educational mobile apps on the iOS App Store. In 2015, Highlights for Children released multiple new mobile apps for kids including Hidden Pictures and My Highlights. In May 2016, a third app called Monster's Day was released. The Highlights Every Day and Highlights Shapes apps launched in 2016 and the Hidden Pictures Puzzle Town app came out in 2017.

In 2018, "44 Pages," a 90-minute documentary, was released covering the magazine's history and legacy. In June, the company launched the Highlights Hangout podcast, an audio version of the magazine. It has stories, sound-based puzzles, listener-submitted jokes, poems, and questions. On June 25, 2019, Highlights for Children's Twitter denounced the practice of family separation at the Mexico–United States border.

In 2021, Amazon's Audible and Highlights partnered to release podcast series based on Goofus and Gallant and Ask Arizona. The magazine also launched the Dear Highlights podcast for parents. In February 2024, Highlights for Children and Google partnered on a special issue of Highlights focusing on digital wellbeing, mental health, and online safety. The collaboration included a limited print run, a digital version, and a custom website based on Google's online safety curriculum.

== Boyds Mills (formerly Highlights Foundation) ==
In 1984, the Highlights Foundation nonprofit was formed to support children's authors and illustrators through retreats, seminars, and workshops. The Foundation maintains a 1,300-acre retreat center in Wayne County, Pennsylvania. George K. Brown, a great-grandson of the original Highlights founders, was elected as executive director in 2018. In 2022, children's author Renée Watson endowed a scholarship for a week-long retreat by a black woman author. On January 11, 2026, the foundation announced it had changed its name to Boyds Mills. It said its purpose remained the same.
