= Sébastien Truchet =

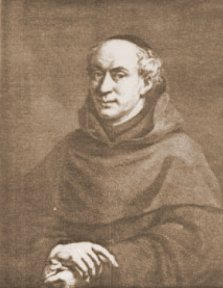
- Born: 1657; Lyon, France
- Died: 5 February 1729 (aged 71–72); France
- Known for: Proportion of typefaces, plane tiling, sundials, channels, weapons
- Scientific career
- Fields: Mathematics, hydraulics, graphics and typography
- Institutions: France under Louis XIV

Jean Truchet (1657 – 5 February 1729), known as Father Sébastian, was a French Dominican priest born in Lyon, who lived under the reign of Louis XIV. He was active in areas such as mathematics, hydraulics, graphics, and typography. He is also known for many inventions.

== Biography ==
Truchet was born in 1657, the son of a merchant father and a very pious mother. At age 16, he joined the Discalced Carmelites. He took the name Sébastien to honor his mother, who was named Sébastiane. In 1693, he was selected by Abbé Bignon to assist his commission investigating the feasibility of compiling a description of all France's artistic and industrial processes for the Comptroller-General of Finances, Jean-Baptiste Colbert. For his assistance, he was named an honoraire of the French Royal Academy in 1699.

== Death ==
Truchet died on 5 February 1729, with the Descriptions of the Arts and Trades still incomplete.

== Contributions ==
Alongside the royal typographer, Jacques Jaugeon, Truchet studied the proportions of typefaces using the French line (1/12 of a French inch), a measurement derived from silversmithing. The commission then invented the first typographic point, using minute fractions of the line to create a bitmap that could be used to mathematically describe and italicize metal type. Their system had unnecessarily great precision relative to the accuracy with which fonts could actually be cut. Further, it did not match the sizes of the fonts then in use. Fournier subsequently corrected these failings, using a larger point with greater compatibility with existing forms of type.

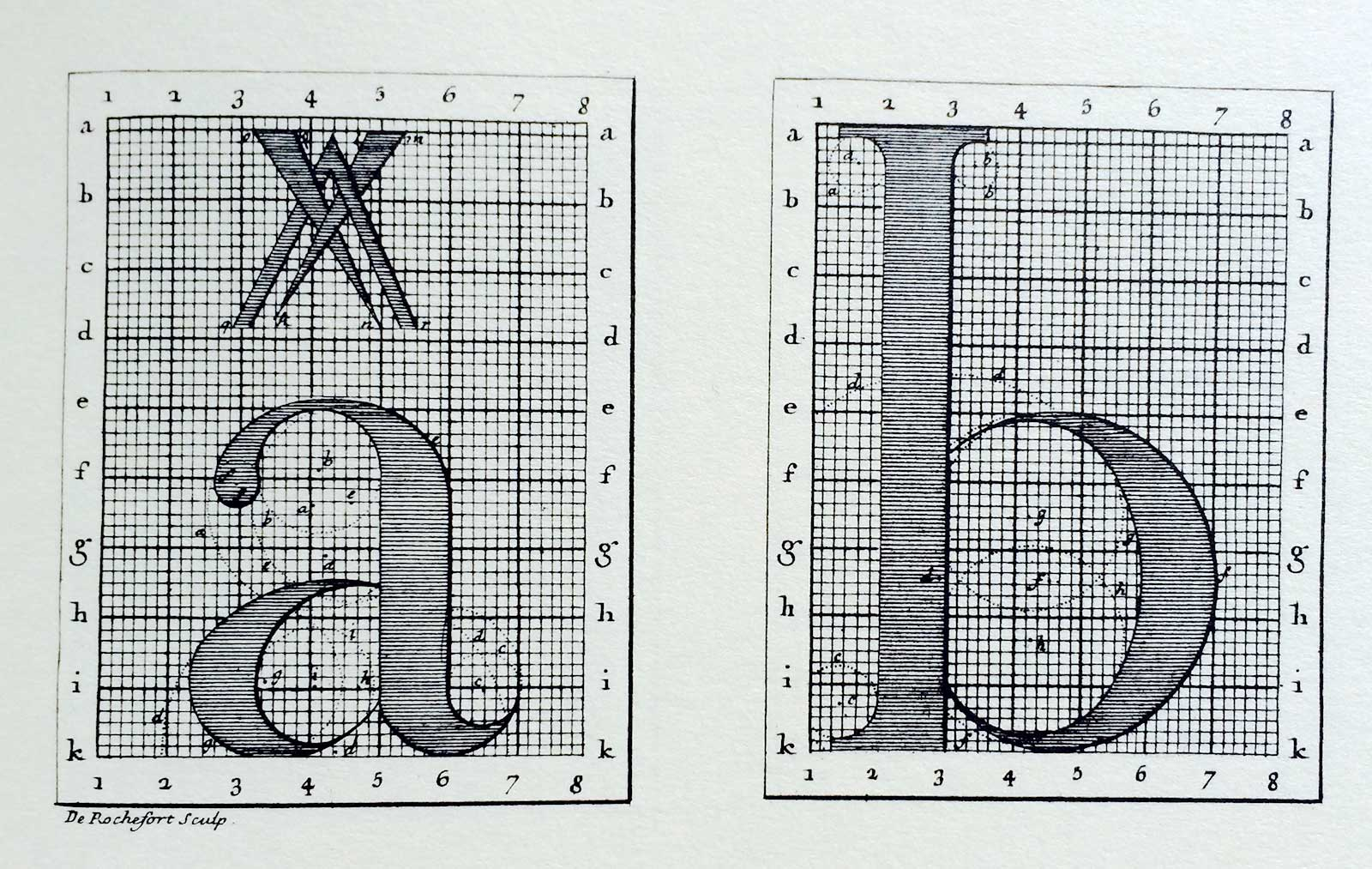
The ⟨a⟩ and ⟨b⟩ of the Romain du Roi, showing the bitmap of Truchet points used in their construction.

The commission also designed the Romain du Roi ('King's Roman'), which influenced Philippe Grandjean and through him the popular Times New Roman fonts. Other typographic innovations in the work of the commission involved the use of both bitmap and vector representations of letter shapes, tabulations of font metrics, and oblique font faces.

In 1699, at the second public meeting of the French Academy, Truchet spoke on the motion of falling bodies, and nearly 20 years later he was one of several scientists to confirm Newton's model of the separation of white light into colors.

As a hydraulics expert, he designed most of the French canals.

Inspired by decorations he had seen on the canals, Truchet studied decorative patterns on ceramic tiles. One particular pattern that he studied involved square tiles split by a diagonal line into two triangles, decorated in contrasting colors. By placing these tiles in different orientations with respect to each other, as part of a square tiling, Truchet observed that many different patterns could be formed. This model of pattern formation was later taken up by Fournier, and is now known to mathematicians and designers as Truchet tiling.

He is also known for his expertise as a watchmaker, and for his inventions concerning sundials, weapons and tools for transplanting large trees within the Versailles gardens.

== See also ==
- Truchet point
