= Armand-Jérôme Bignon =

18th-century French government official

Bignon coat of arms: d'azur à la croix haute d'argent, posée sur une terrasse de sinople d'où sort un cep de vigne qui accole et entoure ladite croix, laquelle est cantonnée de 4 flammes d'argent The vine around the cross is a reminder of the family's birthplace of Saint-Denis-d'Anjou

Armand-Jérôme Bignon (21 October 1711, Paris – 8 March 1772, Paris) was a French lawyer, royal librarian and conseiller d'État.

== Biography ==
The lord of Île Belle and Hardricourt, he was made avocat général to the Grand Conseil in 1729, maître des requêtes for Soissons in 1737 and president of the Grand Conseil in 1738.

In 1743, on his brother's death he was made royal librarian (a post Armand-Jérôme had inherited in turn from their uncle Jean-Paul Bignon). Armand-Jérôme resigned from it in 1770 in favour of his son Jérôme-Frédéric.

He was elected to the Académie française in 1743 and to the Académie des Inscriptions in 1751. He was made conseiller d’État in 1762 and prévôt des marchands de Paris in 1764. The scholar Dupuy pronounced his elogy. It was his negligence in the latter post that caused the accidents in the firework display for the marriage of the Dauphin (later Louis XVI) and Marie Antoinette in May 1770 that left over 300 dead and a greater number of wounded. Even so, he appeared in his box at the Opéra only three days after the disaster, causing all Paris to become indignant.

Under Louis XIII, the prévôt des marchands de Paris and the two premiers échevins were fined for not having repaired a bridge whose collapse killed four or five people. Under Louis XV, his faults born of a lack of foresight were never punished. Paris thus avenged itself by bon mots against him, including the Latin anagram of his name as Ibi non rem, damna gero (I don't do good, I do evil).

== Works ==
Armand Jérôme Bignon never published anything, though he did leave manuscript memoirs of a journey to Spain and Italy (now held at the Bibliothèque nationale de France).
