= Jacques Jaugeon =

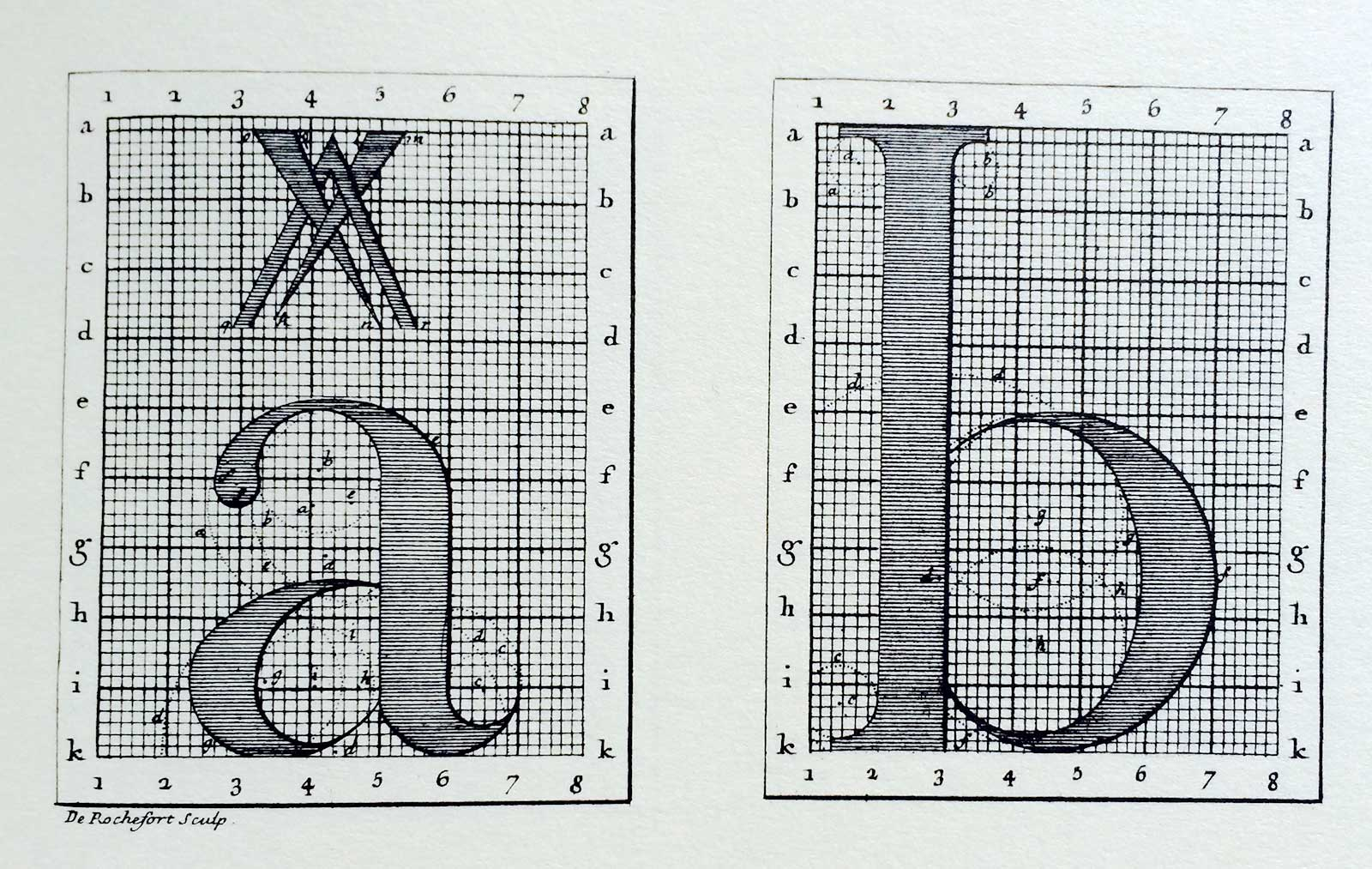
The ⟨a⟩ and ⟨b⟩ of the Romain du Roi, showing the bitmap of Truchet points used in their construction

Jacques Jaugeon (fl. 1690–1710) was a French scholar and the royal typographer during the reign of King Louis XIV. He was a member of the Bignon Commission charged by the minister Colbert to compile the Description of the Arts and Trades. One of the commission's first fields of inquiry was into printing and typography, where Jaugeon assisted Father Truchet in creating the first typographic point system and the Romain du Roi ("King's Roman"), the font later developed into Times New Roman.
