= Gilles Filleau des Billettes =

French scholar

Gilles Filleau des Billettes (1634 - 15 August 1720) was a scholar, member of the Académie des Sciences who corresponded with Leibniz. His personal copy of one of Leibniz's mathematical papers was rediscovered in 1956.

== Biography ==
Gilles was born at Poitiers in 1634 into a Calvinist family, the youngest son of Nicolas Filleau des Billettes and his wife, Françoise Béliard, who was described by Louis Moréri as being from one of the most noble houses in the region. He moved with his brothers to Paris, where he lived most of his life. He formed part of the Bignon Commission which worked towards the establishment of the Descriptions of the Arts and Trades.

He married twice, but the name of only one wife is known: Françoise Sicard, who died on 24 April 1671 in Poitiers.

His brother, François Filleau de St Martin, was famous for making the first French translation of Don Quixote.

Gilles had one more brother, Jean Filleau de la Chaise, and sisters Françoise (who married Jean de la Lande, "seigneur de Lavau"), Marie, and possibly Catherine (who married John Chabusant).

== Sources ==
- Louis Moréri, Le grand dictionaire historique
- Jean Mesnard, Pascal et les Roannez, Volume 2
- Bernard Le Bovier de Fontenelle, Éloges des académiciens de l'Académie royale des sciences, morts depuis l'an 1699, Volume 2, Paris, Chez les Libraires associés, 1766
- Transactions of the Huguenot Society of South Carolina, Issues 33-39
- Jeanne Leroy-Fournier, “Les Origines poitevines de l’écrivain protestant Samuel Chappuzeau”, Bulletin de la société des antiquaires de l’Ouest et des musées de Poitiers (1976), 13, ser. 4, pp. 121–132
- Pierre Louis Manuel, L'année françoise ou vies des hommes qui ont honoré la France, pour tous les jours de l'année, Volume 3, Paris, Chez Nyon, 1789
