= Jean-Paul Grandjean de Fouchy =

French astronomer

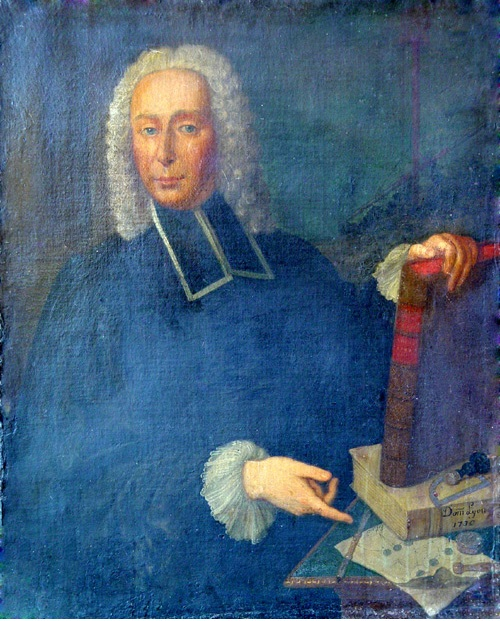

Jean-Paul Grandjean de Fouchy (French pronunciation: [ʒɑ̃ pɔl ɡʁɑ̃ʒɑ̃ də fuʃi]; 10 March 1707 – 15 April 1788) was a French astronomer from a noble family. He introduced the analemma curve (a figure of 8) which allowed the calculation of the local solar noon according to the time of year in 1740. Analemmatic sundials were introduced by J. J. Lalande.

Grandjean de Fouchy was born in Paris to Mâconnais nobleman Philippe Grandjean de Fouchy who served under Louis XIV and Marie-Madeleine Hynault. After attempting to follow his father in the type engraving (he had been involved in the design of the Romain du Roi type and was designing a new Hebrew type) and book publishing industry, he became an auditor at the Chambre des Comptes and also became a student of Joseph Nicolas Delisle. He joined the Society of Arts in Paris in 1726 and began to contribute notes on his astronomy. He was elected to the Academy of Sciences in 1731 and made a permanent secretary to the Academy from 1743. He was appointed as an astronomer in 1731 and during this period he invented an octant. His work at the Academy included writing obituaries for deceased members and towards the end of his life he considered producing a history of the Academy of Sciences. He took an interest in music and played the organ at the local church on Sundays.

Grandjean de Fouchy was married twice first to Madam de Boistis-Sandeau and then to Madam Desportes-Pardeillan. He had a daughter from the first marriage and a daughter and two sons from the second. At the age of seventy-six he was injured by falling on a heap of stones and suffered from aphasia which he described.
