= Bignon Commission =

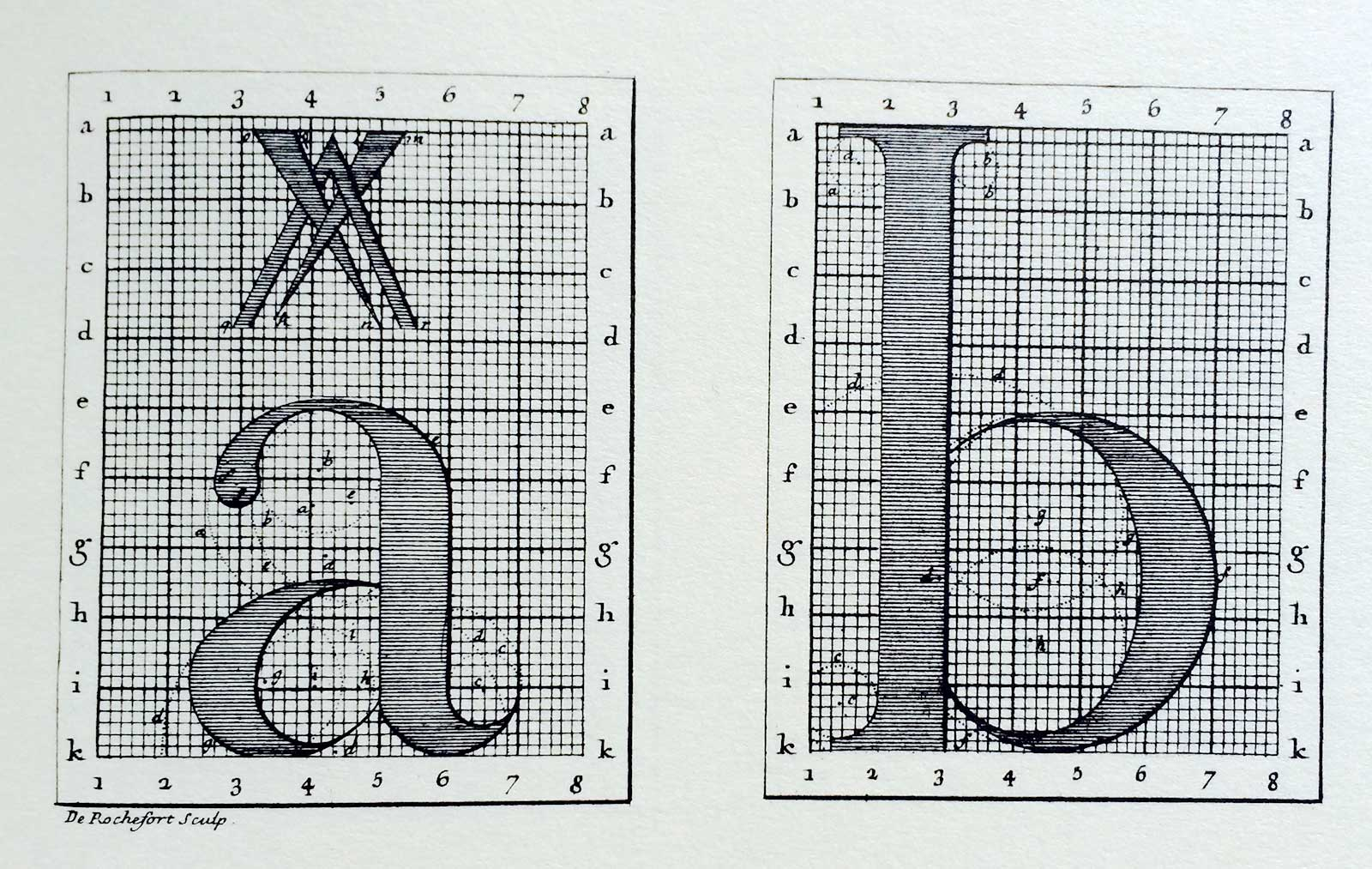
The ⟨a⟩ and ⟨b⟩ of the Romain du Roi, showing the bitmap of Truchet points used in their construction.

The Bignon Commission (French: commission Bignon; 1693–1718) was a group directed by the French minister Colbert to examine the feasibility of compiling a description of all the arts and industrial processes used in France. It was headed by Abbé Bignon, who selected the royal typographer Jacques Jaugeon, the scholar Gilles Filleau des Billettes, and Father Sébastien Truchet to assist him. As part of their participation, the three were named to the Academy by King Louis XIV in 1699.

The commission reported that the project would be feasible and began by examining French printing and typography, as the "art by which all others are preserved". As part of the project, Jaugeon and Truchet established the first typographic point system, vector fonts, the bitmap, slanted italic type, (Note: Italic type to this point was cut separately as a similar but distinct font. The Romain du roi had no separate italic font but was italicized mathematically through deforming the axes of its bitmap.) and the Romain du Roi ("King's Roman") font.

In 1710, the work continued under a new chief editor, René Antoine Ferchault de Réaumur. The commission was reorganized in 1718, with other groups continuing its work. The release of Diderot and D'Alembert's Encyclopedia in 1750 led the academy to finally publish a 73-volume Descriptions of the Arts and Trades but it remains generally unknown.

== See also ==
- Truchet point
