= Jean-Paul Bignon =

French ecclesiastic, statesman, writer, preacher and librarian to Louis XIV of France

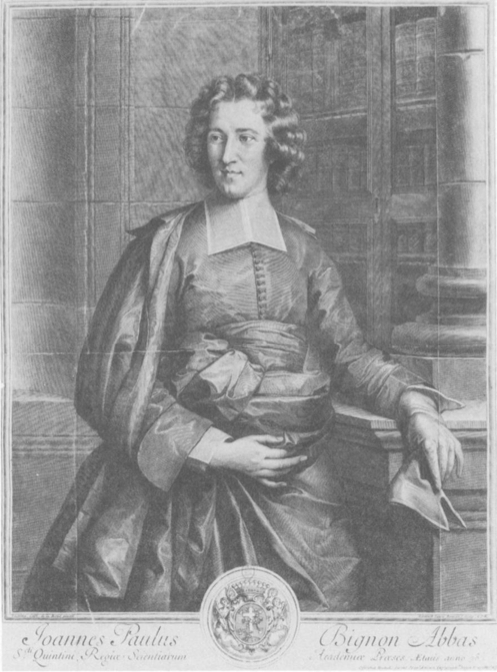
- Portrait by Gérard Edelinck, 1700
- Born: 19 September 1662; Paris, France
- Died: 14 March 1743 (aged 80); Île Belle, France
- Education: Port-Royal Abbey, Paris; Collège d'Harcourt

The Abbé Jean-Paul Bignon, Cong.Orat. (French pronunciation: [ʒɑ̃ pɔl biɲɔ̃]; 19 September 1662, Paris – 14 March 1743, Île Belle) was a French ecclesiastic, statesman, writer and preacher and librarian to King Louis XIV. His protégé, Joseph Pitton de Tournefort, named the genus Bignonia (Virginia jasmine) after him in 1694.

== Biography ==
Bignon coat of arms: d'azur à la croix haute d'argent, posée sur une terrasse de sinople d'où sort un cep de vigne qui accole et entoure ladite croix, laquelle est cantonnée de 4 flammes d'argent The vine around the cross is a reminder of the family's ancestral city, Saint-Denis-d'Anjou

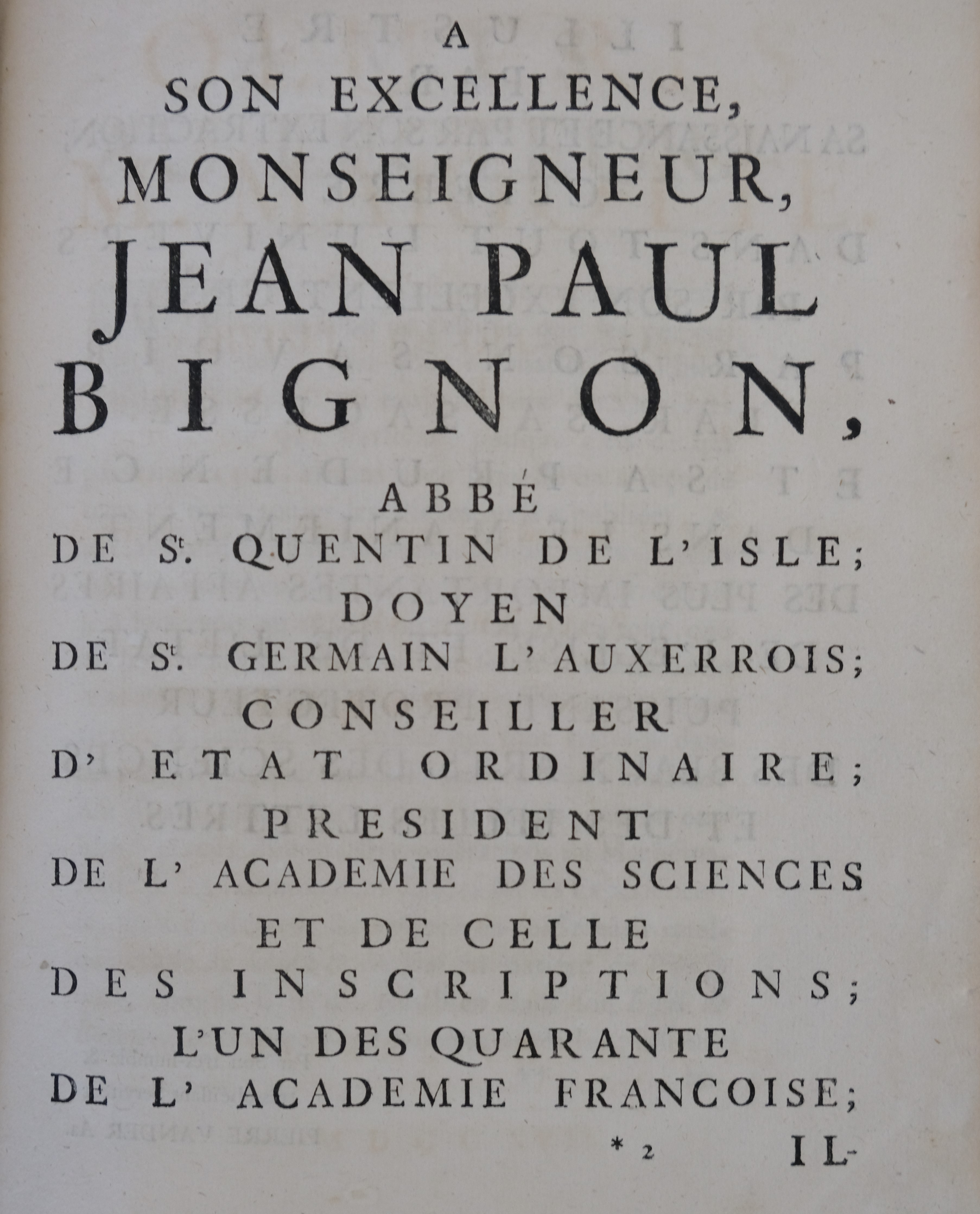
Dedication to Bignon in a 1717 copy of volume I of "Œuvres de M. Mariotte," by Edme Mariotte

Born in Paris, Bignon was the grandson of the lawyer and statesman, Jérôme Bignon, and, though older, the nephew of the Count Jérôme Phélypeaux. He did his elementary studies at the school of the famed Abbey of Port Royal in Paris, then studied at the Collège d'Harcourt, following which he entered the Oratory of Paris, and did theological studies at the Seminary of Saint Magloire attached to it. In 1691 he completed his studies and was ordained to the priesthood. In 1693 he was made commendatory abbot of Saint-Quentin-en-l'Isle and preacher to King Louis; he was also appointed to succeed to Seat 20 in the French Academy. He was charged by the minister Colbert to head the Bignon Commission, which investigated the feasibility and then began the compilation of a guide to French artistic and industrial processes, published in the following century as the Descriptions of the Arts and Trades.

He organized the bureaux de la librairie and the committee of expert censors in 1699.

Bignon worked with his uncle to prepare a new set of rules for the Academy, allowing for honorary membership, which were signed by the king in January 1699. The new rules, however, were rejected by its members. The rejection shocked him to such a degree that he refused to attend its meetings thereafter.

Bignon was a patron of Antoine Galland, the first European translator of One Thousand and One Nights. He was also the author of Les aventures d'Abdalla, fils d'Hanif (The adventures of Abdalla, son of Hanif), published in 1712–1714, a novel framed as the title character's search for the fountain of youth and composed of "stories of adventure and love" in which "great stress is laid upon the 'horrid,' the grotesque, the fantastic."

His fame as a preacher is exemplified by two completely different panegyrics he gave on the same day, for the feast day of St. Louis IX. He was elected a Fellow of the Royal Society in 1734.

== Publications ==
Bignon also contributed to the Médailles du règne de Louis le Grand, Sacre de Louis XV. From 1706 to 1714, he presided over the committee of men of letters who edited the Journal des sçavans, which position he took again in 1724, with the Abbé Pierre Desfontaines.
