= Île Belle =

Coordinates: 49°00′01″N 1°53′57″E

Île Belle was a former island in the River Seine. It was located in Yvelines between Hardricourt and Les Mureaux, in the commune of Meulan-en-Yvelines. The island has previously been known under the names of Île Saint Côme and Île Saint Damien.

== Geography ==
Île Belle is located between Hardricourt and Mézy-sur-Seine on the right shore and Les Mureaux on the left one. It is the north part of a five kilometer long island formed by the fusion with two other former islands, Île de Mézy and Île de Juziers

It is separated upstream from Île du Fort by the Saint Côme arm. It is administratively attached to the commune of Meulan-en-Yvelines. The island is linked to right shore by a bridge over the Melan arm, by the Rhin et Danube Bridge to the left shore and by the Saint-Côme Bridge to Île du Fort.

Within Île Belle are located a swimming pool administered by an intercommunal syndicate and a hotel of the brand Mercure located in the ruins of an 18th-century castle, who belonged to Armand-Jérôme Bignon, the royal librarian of Louis XV, as well as a cynodrome devoted to dog races.
