= Saint-Denis-d'Anjou =

Saint-Denis-d’Anjou
- Commune
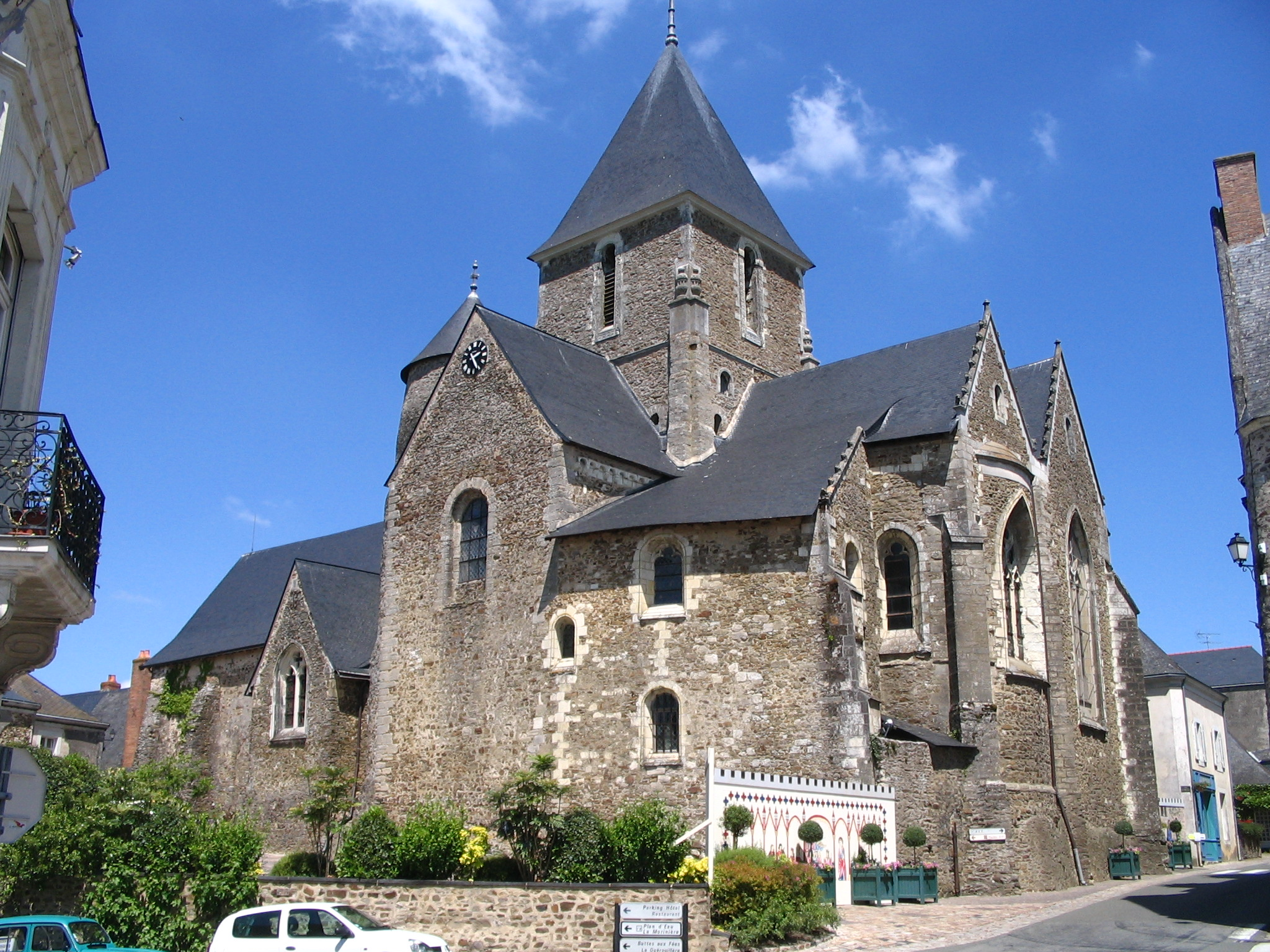
- The church of Saint-Denis, in Saint-Denis-d'Anjou

- Coat of arms
- Location of Saint-Denis-d’Anjou
- Location within France Location within Pays de la Loire
- Coordinates: 47°47′30″N 0°26′23″W
- Country: France
- Region: Pays de la Loire
- Department: Mayenne
- Arrondissement: Château-Gontier
- Canton: Château-Gontier-sur-Mayenne-1
- Intercommunality: Pays de Château-Gontier

Government
  - Mayor (2020–2026): Dominique de Valicourt
- Area^{1}: 41.89 km^{2} (16.17 sq mi)
- Elevation: 37 m (121 ft)
- Highest elevation: 103 m (338 ft)
- Lowest elevation: 20 m (66 ft)
- Population (2023): 1,495
  - Density: 35.69/km^{2} (92.43/sq mi)
- Time zone: UTC+01:00 (CET)
  - Summer (DST): UTC+02:00 (CEST)
- INSEE/Postal code: 53210 /53290
- ^{1} French Land Register data, which excludes lakes, ponds, glaciers > 1 km^{2} (0.386 sq mi or 247 acres) and river estuaries.

Saint-Denis-d'Anjou (French pronunciation: [sɛ̃ dəni dɑ̃ʒu]) is a commune in the Mayenne department in north-western France.

== See also ==
- Communes of Mayenne
