= Romain du Roi =

French typeface from 1692

The Romain du Roi (French pronunciation: [ʁɔmɛ̃ dy ʁwa], "King's roman") was a typeface developed in France beginning in 1692. The name refers to Louis XIV who commissioned the design of the new typeface for use by the Royal Print Office.

The Romain du Roi stands as a landmark of typography in the Age of Enlightenment. The conception of the letterforms reflects a difference in attitude from the prevailing roman typefaces before it. Whereas previous roman typefaces developed naturally over time, evolving in the hands of punch cutters from the typefaces of the fifteenth century, the Romain du Roi was the result of rational design: the letterforms were mapped on grids before being cut into metal.

The Romain du Roi was not the first "constructed alphabet". Felice Feliciano was the first to recreate geometrically the alphabet of roman inscriptions, and published it in 1463 as Alphabetum Romanum Codex Vaticanus 6852. The Romain du Roi, however, because of its allegiance to the grid, shows a distinct shift in style, with an increased emphasis on verticality and increased contrast between thick and thin elements, a style that influenced the Transitional typefaces of Pierre Simon Fournier and John Baskerville.

The letterforms were the work of the Royal Academy's Bignon Commission as part of its investigation of French typography and printing for the compilation of the Description of the Arts and Trades of France. The capital letters were drawn on 8×8 grids, the lowercase letters on rectangular grids. The committee's designs were engraved by Louis Simonneau. Punches for the metal type were cut by Philippe Grandjean, who took some liberty with his type, to moderate the cold geometry of the designs. The type was first used for Médailles sur les principaux événements du règne de Louis le Grand.

The Romain du Roi had serifs on both left and right sides at the top of ⟨b, d, h, i, k, l⟩. ⟨l⟩ had an extra serif to the left at the mean line to distinguish it from capital ⟨I⟩.

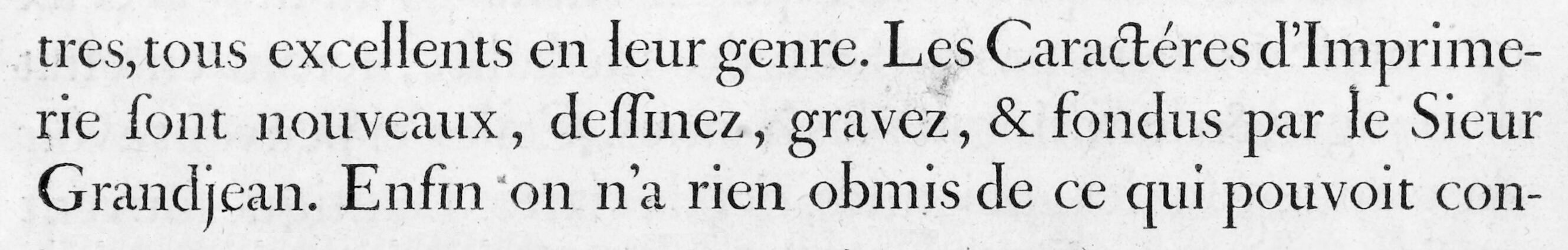
Sample of Romain du Roi in 1702.

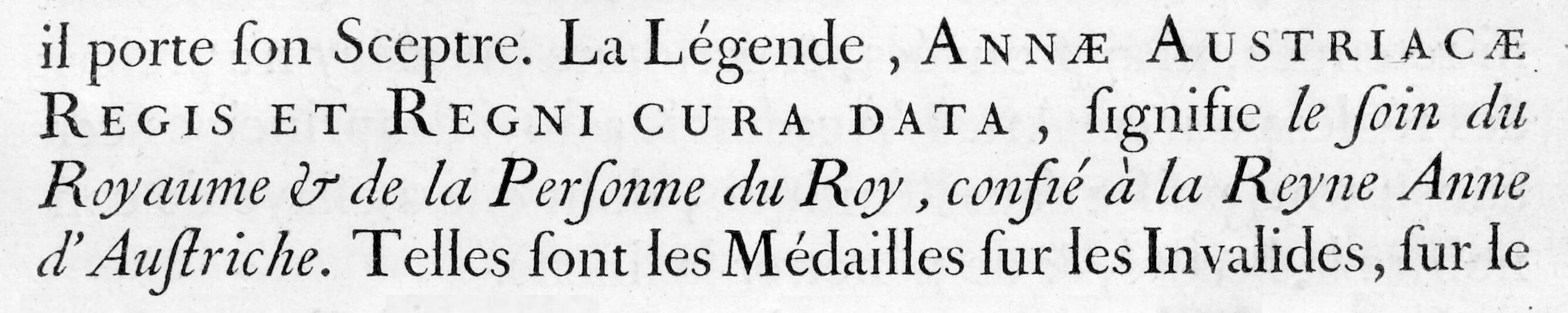
Sample of Romain du Roi in 1702, showing small capitals and italics characters.
