= Philippe Grandjean =

French type engraver (1666–1714)

Philippe Grandjean de Fouchy (French pronunciation: [filip ɡʁɑ̃ʒɑ̃ də fuʃi]; 1666–1714) was a French type engraver notable for his series of Roman and italic types known as Romain du Roi (French: King's Roman), produced in tandem with Louis Simonneau.

== Information ==
King Louis XIV, in 1692, directed that a typeface be designed at any necessary expense for the exclusive use of the Royal printer. The design was carried out by Grandjean and Simonneau with approval and supervision by a group of mathematicians and philosophers.
