= Descriptions des Arts et Métiers =

Collection of books published by the Parisian Royal Academy of Sciences

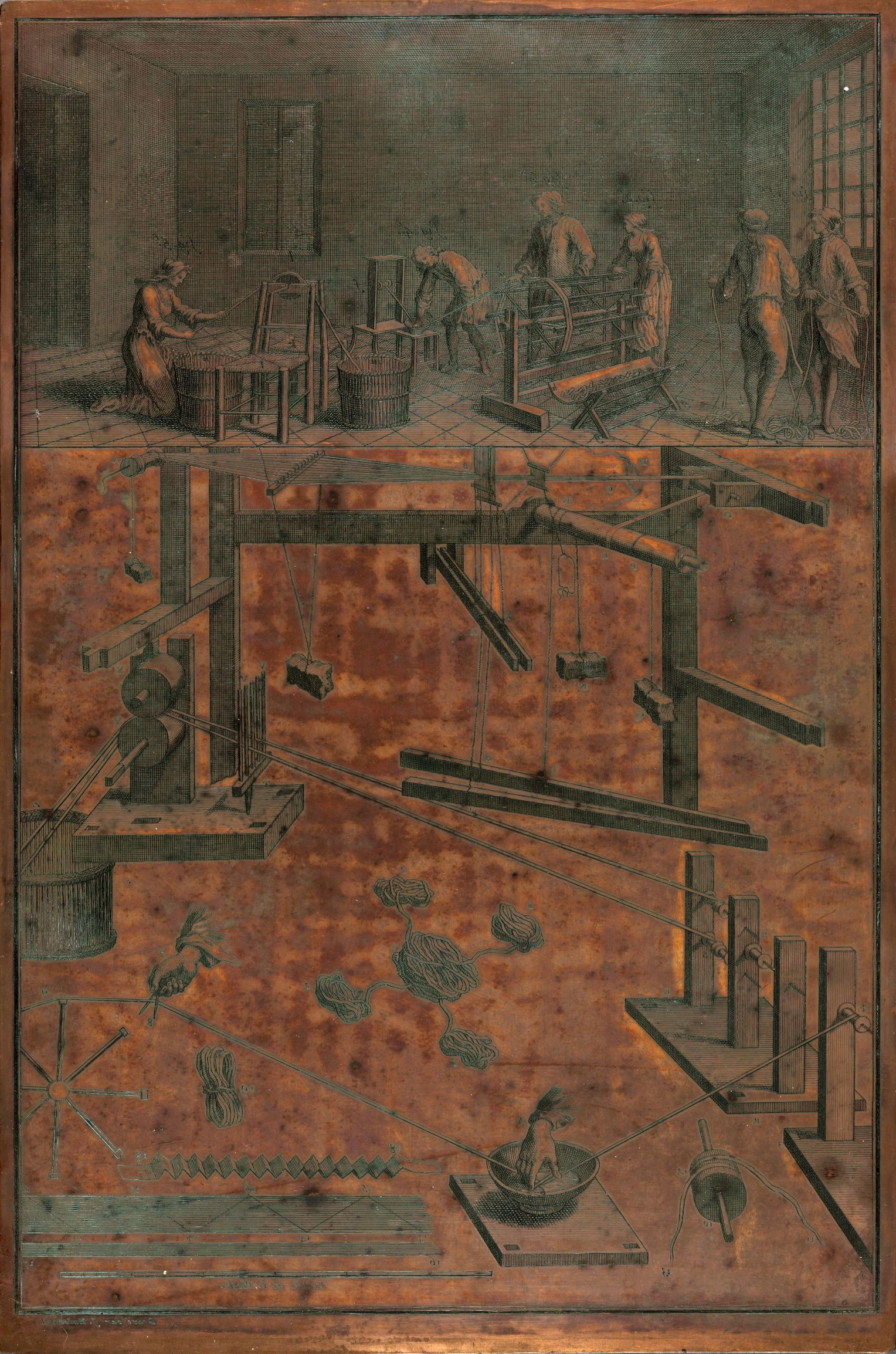
Copperplate from Description des Arts et Métiers

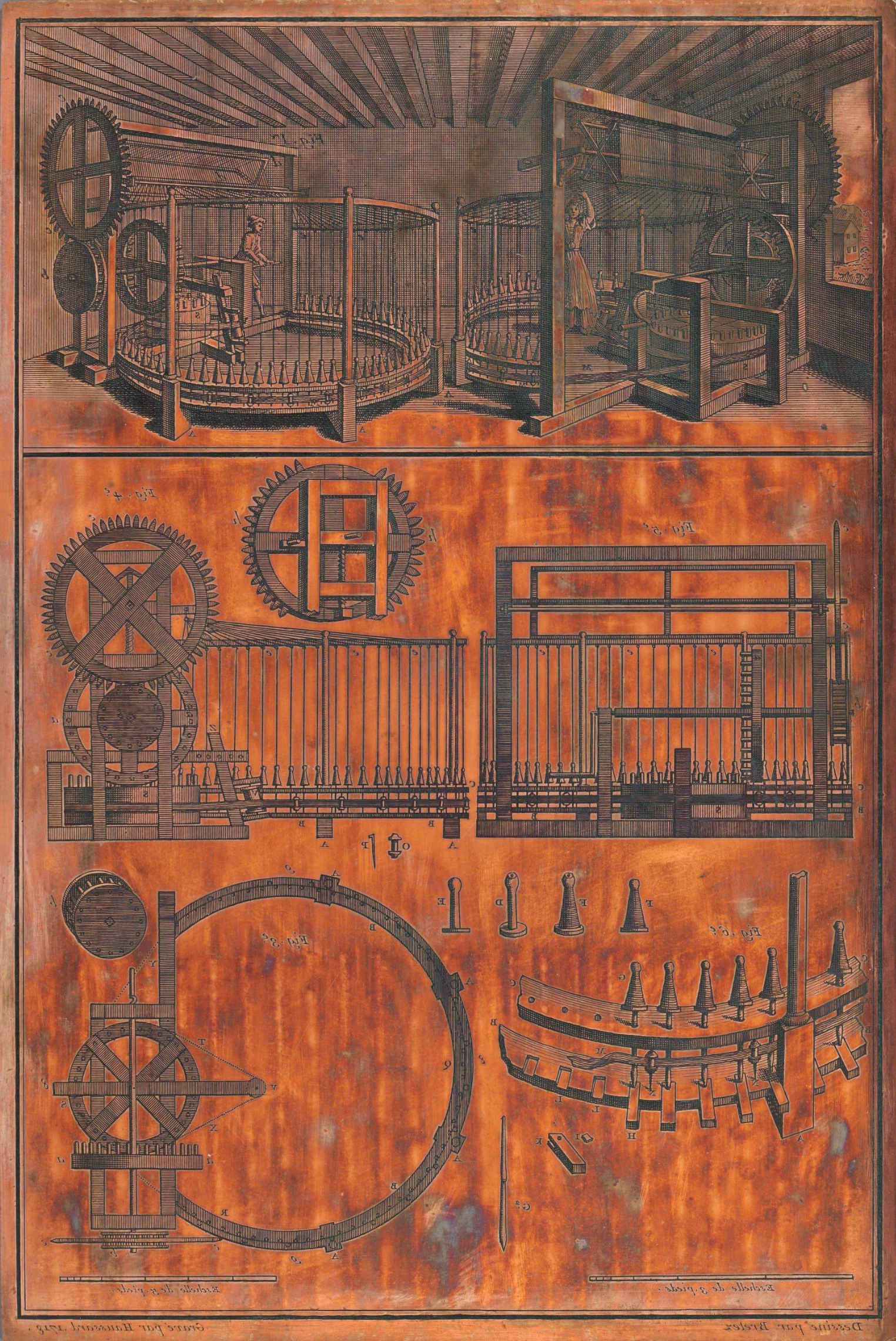
Copperplate from Description des Arts et Métiers

Descriptions des Arts et Métiers, faites ou approuvées par messieurs de l'Académie Royale des Sciences (French for "Descriptions of the Arts and Trades, made under the direction of the gentlemen of the Royal Academy of Sciences"), is a collection of books on crafts that was published by the Parisian Royal Academy of Sciences between 1761 and 1788. The full series comprises 113 folio volumes along with three supplements, and provide detailed accounts of a wide range of handcraft and manufacturing processes carried out in France at that time. The volumes are well-illustrated, with precise engravings by Jean Elie Bertrand (1737–1779) a noted typographer from Neuchâtel, where the printing was done. Many of them provide the background for shorter articles in Diderot's Encyclopedia, which was appearing at much the same time.

The project had its origin in request from Colbert in 1675 to the Academy Royal des Sciences for detailed accounts of various mechanic arts to be prepared and for new machines to be reported upon. This led to the formation of the Bignon Commission under Abbé Bignon. René-Antoine Ferchault de Réaumur (1683–1757) became editor soon after he joined the academy. He inherited number of drawings (the earliest prepared in 1693) and an illustrated manuscript on printing, type and book binding, which had been prepared in 1704. It was left to Réaumur's successor Duhamel du Monceau to bring about the publication of the series, probably as the result of the competition from the Encyclopedia.

The articles and engravings in the Descriptions are more detailed and accurate than those in the Encyclopedia, and so are of more value for technical historians today. There is evidence that proofs of some 150 plates were stolen by agents of Diderot who had them re-engraved for his project. There is a similarity between many of the plates used in the two works.

The first of the volumes appeared in 1761, and the last in 1788.

== Topics covered ==
- Building construction
- Clothing
- Shipbuilding
- Fishing
- Woodworking
- Pipe-organ making
- Metal working
- Turning and lathe work
- Scientific-instrument making
- Flour milling
- Baking and sugar refining
- Paper-making and bookbinding
- Tanning and soapmaking
- Wine and vineyards
- Cutlery and surgical instrument making
- Mining and metallurgy
- Porcelain and pottery manufacture
- Painting
- Textile manufacture

In all the series comprises 13,000 pages and 1,804 plates.

This series is an incomparable source of detailed information about the techniques of handicraft and manufacture in the 18th century. A handful of libraries worldwide have complete sets but it was reprinted in facsimile in 25 volumes by Slatkine Reprints of Geneva in 1984 with ISBN 2-05-100610-5. A microfilm version is also available from Gale as part of their Seventeenth- and Eighteenth-Century Periodicals and Academy Publications series
