= Unit of volume =

Unit of measurement for measuring volume or capacity

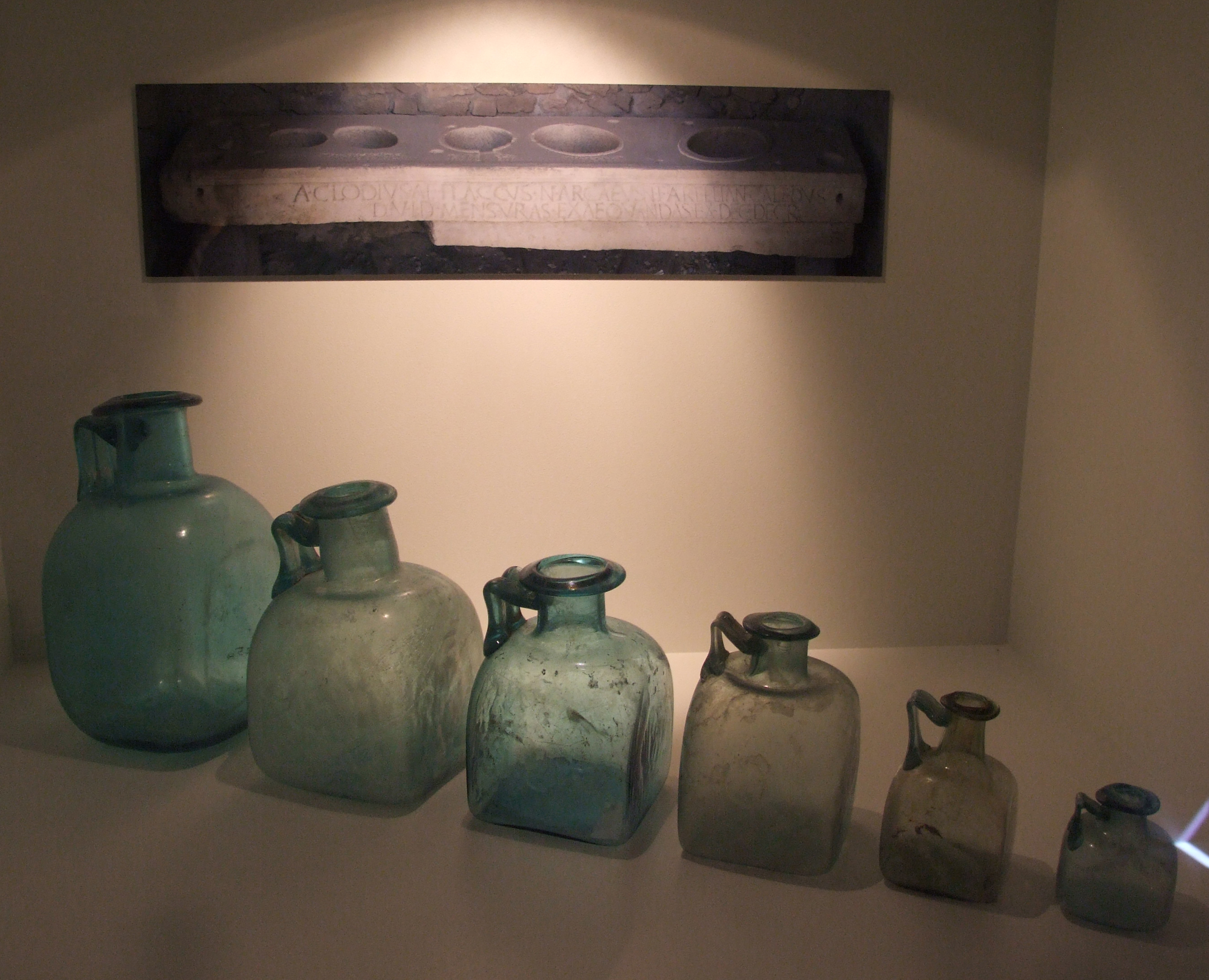
6 volumetric measures from the mens ponderia in Pompeii, a municipal institution for the control of weights and measures (79 A. D.)

A unit of volume is a unit of measurement for measuring volume or capacity, the extent of an object or space in three dimensions. Units of capacity may be used to specify the volume of fluids or bulk goods, for example water, rice, sugar, grain or flour.

== Units ==
According to the SI system, the base unit for measuring length is the metre. The SI unit of volume is thus the cubic metre, which is a derived unit, where:

1 m^{3} = 1 m • 1 m • 1 m.

== Comparison ==
Volume
Unit of measure	cubic metre	litre	Reference size	Usage
1 cubic metre	= 1	= 1000		base unit in SI
1 barrel	= 0.158 987 294 928	= 158.987294928	= 42 US gallons = 9,702 cubic inches	e. g. for oil
1 cubic foot	= 0.028 316 846 592	= 28.316846592	= 1,728 cubic inches	
1 cubic decimetre	= 0.001	= 1		
1 litre	= 0.001	= 1		
1 gallon (US)	= 0.003 785 411 784	= 3.785411784	= 8 pints (US) = 231 cubic inches	
1 pint (US)	= 0.000 473 176 473	= 0.473176473		
1 cubic inch	= 0.000 016 387 064	= 0.016387064		
1 cubic centimetre	= 0.000 001	= 0.001		

== Forestry and timber industry ==
=== British Commonwealth ===
- Hoppus, cubic foot measure used in the British Empire and, nowadays, some Commonwealth countries for timber.

=== Germany ===
- Festmeter (fm), a unit of volume for logs
  - Erntefestmeter (Efm), a unit of volume for trees or forests which assumes a 10% loss due to bark and 10% during the felling process.
  - Vorratsfestmeter (Vfm), a unit of volume for trees or forests based on measurements including the bark.
- Raummeter (rm), or stere (stacked firewood) = 0.7 m^{3} (stacked woodpile with air spaces)
  - Schüttmeter, or Schüttraummeter (piled wood with air spaces)

=== USA and Canada ===
- Board foot, unit of lumber
- Cord, a unit of dry volume used to measure firewood and pulpwood
- Cubic yard, equal to 27 cu ft

== See also ==
- Faggot (unit)
- History of measurement
- List of unusual units of measurement#Volume
- Orders of magnitude (volume)
- Metre Convention
- Physical quantity
