= Stere =

Measurement of volume, 1 cubic meter

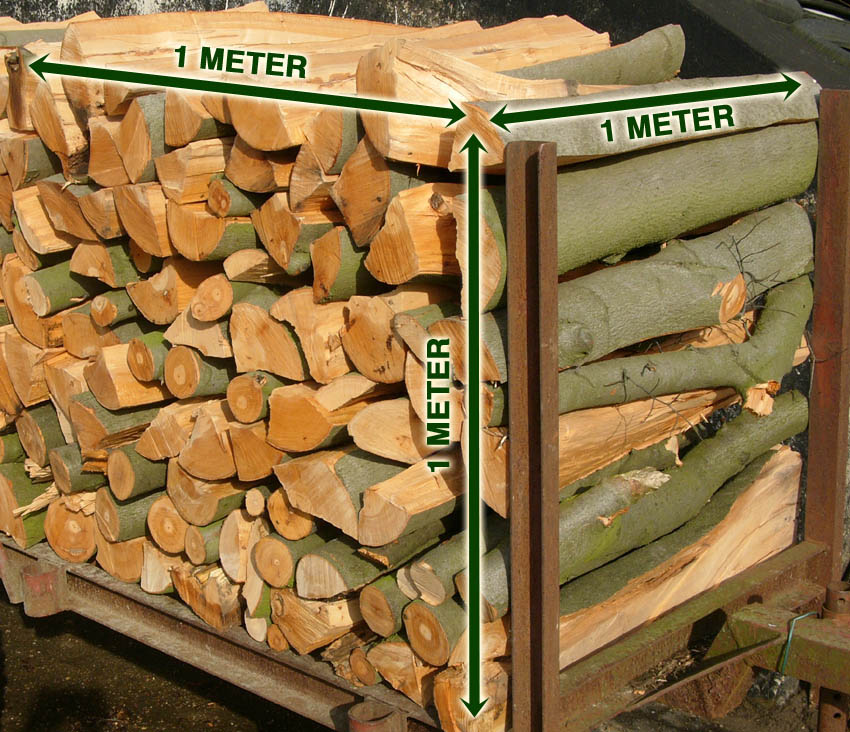
The stere as a cubic metre of stacked firewood

The stere or stère (st) is a unit of volume in the original metric system equal to one cubic metre. The stere is typically used for measuring large quantities of firewood or other cut wood, while the cubic meter is used for uncut wood. The name was coined from the Greek στερεός stereós, "solid", in 1795 in France as a metric analogue to the cord. The unit was introduced to remove regional disparities of this former unit, for which the length could vary greatly from 6 to 13.5 m. It is not part of the modern metric system (SI) and is no longer a legal unit in France, but remains used in the commerce of firewood.

== Background ==
The correspondence between stere and cubic meters of stacked wood is imprecise because it depends on the length of the logs used and on how irregular they are. The stere corresponds to 1 m^{3} (35.3 ft^{3}) of wood, made exclusively with logs of 1 m (3.3 ft) in length, all stacked parallel and neatly arranged. If the logs are less than 1 m, the volume of visible wood decreases because the voids are better occupied. Thus the "stere" no longer corresponds to 1 m^{3}, but to 0.8 m^{3} (28.3 ft^{3}) for 50 cm (19.7 in) logs, 0.7 m^{3} (24.7 ft^{3}) for 33 cm (13.0 in) logs and 0.6 m^{3} (21.2 ft^{3}) for 25 cm (9.8 in) logs.

In Dutch and German, a closely related unit called kuub (Dutch), short for kubieke meter, or "Kubikmeter" (German) which differs from a stere. Whereas a "kuub" or "Kubikmeter" is a solid cubic metre, as it was traditionally used for wood, a stere (in German: Raummeter) is a cubic metre pile of woodblocks. A stere or Raummeter is less than a kuub or full cubic metre of wood, because the spaces between the woodblocks are included in a stere, while they do not count towards a kuub or Kubikmeter. In Finnish, the same unit is known as motti (from Swedish mått, "measure").

The stere as used in contexts outside the timber industry is not subject to the same ambiguity. In particular, stere and kilostere are sometimes used in hydrology, as the kilostere (1,000 m^{3} (35,315 ft^{3}) or megalitre) is a slightly smaller metric analogue of an acre-foot (approximately 1,233 m^{3} (43,500 ft^{3})), similar to the relationship of the metric tonne to the short ton.

== See also ==
- Board foot
- Cord (unit)
- Cubic ton
- Faggot (unit)
- Forest product
- Hoppus
- List of metric units
- List of unusual units of measurement
- Petrograd Standard
- Units of measurement
