= Distance (disambiguation) =

Distance is a numerical description or measurement of how far apart objects are.

Distance may also refer to:

== Science and math ==
- Distance function, defines a distance between each pair of elements of a set
- Distance (graph theory), the distance between two vertices in a graph
- Cosmic distance ladder, the succession of methods by which astronomers determine the distances to celestial objects
- Social distance, a sociological concept relating to personal space and proxemics
- An obsolete unit of measure; see List of unusual units of measurement

== Music ==
- Distance (band), a late-1980s rock supergroup featuring Bernard Edwards and Tony Thompson
- Distance (musician), British music producer and DJ, influential on the dubstep genre

=== Albums ===
- Distance (Antagonist EP), 2007
- Distance (Battery album), 1996
- Distance (Dan Michaelson and The Coastguards album), 2014
- Distance (Hikaru Utada album), 2001

=== Songs ===
- "Distance" (SS501 song), 2007
- "Distance" (F.T. Island song), 2011
- "Distance" (Christina Perri song), 2012
- "Distance" (Mammoth song), 2020
- "Distance", by the Pat Metheny Group from Still Life (Talking), 1987
- "Distance", by All Saints from Saints & Sinners, 2000
- "Distance", by Ian Chan, 2022
- "Distance", by OneRepublic from Human, 2020
- "Distance", by Rudimental from Ground Control, 2021

== Other ==
- Distance (2001 film), a Japanese film directed by Hirokazu Koreeda
- Distance, a 2002 American short film directed by Jonathan Jakubowicz
- Distance (2015 film), a Chinese film
- Distances (film), a 2018 Spanish film
- Distance (Doctor Who), a Doctor Who short story
- Distance (video game), a 2018 racing game

== See also ==
- The Distance (disambiguation)
