= IPF =

Ipf or IPF may refer to:

== Computing ==
- Interchangeable Preservation Format, an Amiga Disk File format
- Invalid page fault, related to virtual memory
- Information Presentation Facility, help system on OS/2
- IPFilter, firewall and NAT on Unix
- Itanium processor family, a computer architecture

== Sport ==
- International Pickleball Federation
- International Powerlifting Federation

== Other ==
- Idiopathic pulmonary fibrosis, a chronic and fatal disease affecting lung function
- Ice Peak Formation, a geological formation in British Columbia, Canada
- Independent Production Fund, a foundation that supports the production of Canadian entertainment content
- Indian People's Front, a mass organisation
- Intaken piled fathom, a cubic measure used for the shipment of pit props
- International Pen Friends, an organization providing pen pals
- Ipf (mountain), a mountain in southern Germany
- Iterative proportional fitting, estimates values in an N-dimensional matrix

== See also ==
- YPF, an Argentinian oil company
