= Honami =

Honami may refer to:

- Honami (name)
- Honami, Fukuoka, a former town in Kaho District, Fukuoka Prefecture, Japan
- 25074 Honami, a minor planet
- Sony Xperia Z1, development codename Honami
