= Cord (unit) =

Unit of volume of wood

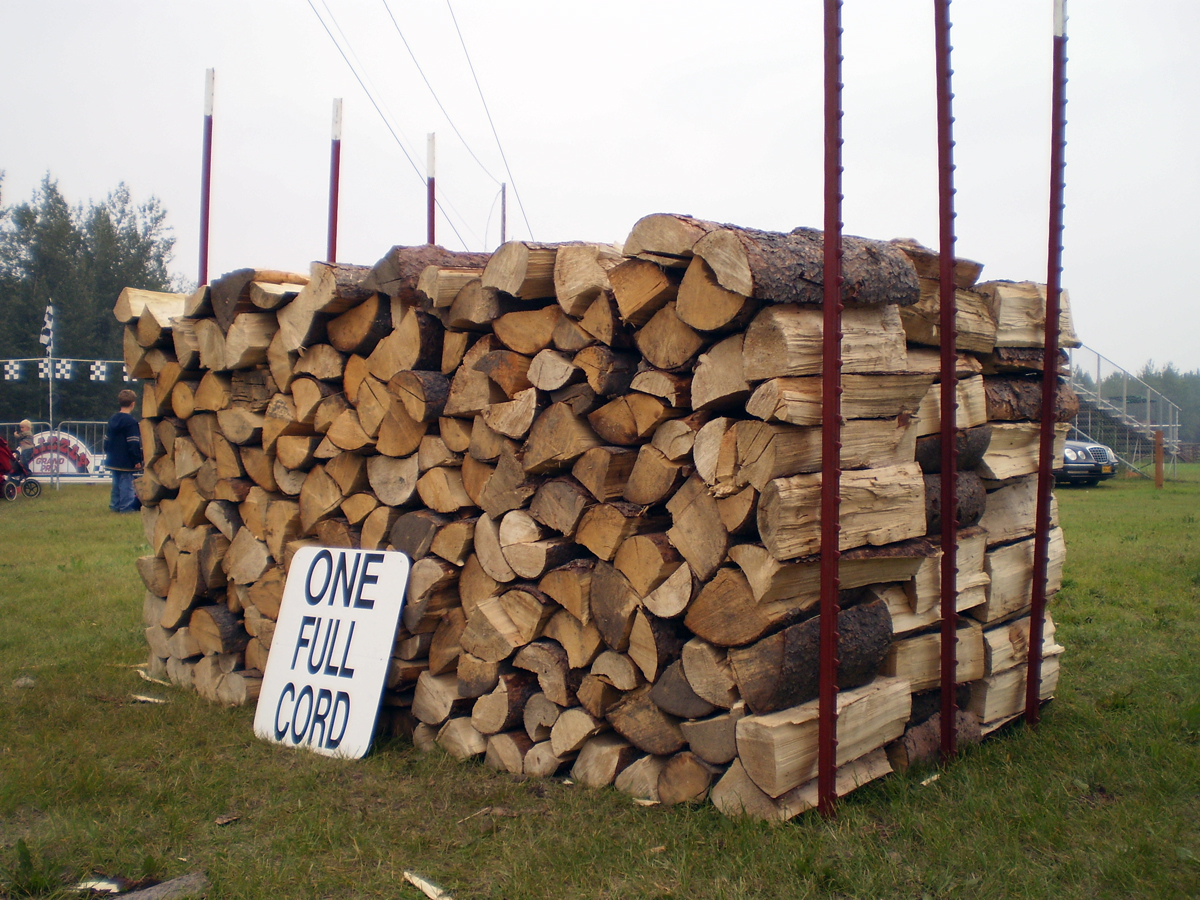
A cord of wood

The cord is a unit of measure of dry volume used to measure firewood and pulpwood in the United States and Canada.

A cord is the amount of wood that, when "racked and well stowed" (arranged so pieces are aligned, parallel, touching, and compact), occupies a volume of 128 cubic feet (3.62 m^{3}). This corresponds to a well-stacked woodpile 4 feet (122 cm) high, 8 feet (244 cm) wide, and 4 feet (122 cm) deep; or any other arrangement of linear measurements that yields the same volume.

== Etymology ==
The name cord probably comes from the use of a cord or string to measure it.

The face cord is a unit of volume for stacked firewood, 4 feet (122 cm) high, 8 feet (244 cm) wide, and 16 inches (41 cm) deep—equal to 1/3 of a cord. The symbol for the unit is fc - cd.

== Definitions ==
In Canada, the cord is legally defined by Measurement Canada. The cord is one of three legal standards for the sale of firewood in Canada: stacked cubic meter (or stere), cubic foot, and cord.

In the United States, the cord is defined by statute in most states. The U.S. National Institute of Standards and Technology Handbook 130, section 2.4.1.2, defines a cord and provides uniform regulations for the sale of fireplace and stove wood. In the metric system, wood is usually measured in steres and cubic meters: 1 stere = 1 m^{3} ≈ 0.276 cords.

Maine appears unique among U.S. states by also defining a "loose thrown cord" or pile of cut firewood: "A cord of 12 or 16 inches (30 or 41 cm) in length shall mean the amount of wood, bark, and air contained in a space of 180 cubic feet (5.1 m^{3}); and a cord of wood 24 inches (61 cm) in length shall mean the amount of wood, bark, and air contained in a space of 195 cubic feet (5.5 m^{3}). [1981, c. 219 (amd).]"

Other non-official terms for firewood volume include standing cord, kitchen cord, running cord, face cord, fencing cord, country cord, long cord, and rick, all subject to local variation. These are usually taken to mean a well-stacked pile of wood in which the logs are shorter or longer than in a legal cord, to accommodate various burners. For example, a face cord commonly consists of wood that is 16 inches (41 cm) long. The volume of a face cord therefore is typically 1/3 of the volume of a full cord even though it is 8 feet (244 cm) long and 4 feet (122 cm) high. A face cord is also called a rick in the midwestern United States.

The term is used in other English-speaking countries, such as New Zealand, but may not have a legal definition.

== Heating value ==
One seasoned (dry) cord of Northern red oak with a heating value of 22.1 million British thermal units per cord (23.3 GJ/cord) has the heating equivalent of 159 U.S. gallons (132 imperial gallons; 602 liters) of fuel oil with a heating value of 138,700 British thermal units per U.S. gallon (38.7 megajoules per liter).

== Australia ==
Until metrication in Australia, an imperial cord was a measurement for wood and firewood. The measurements for a cord of wood were 4 feet high by 8 feet wide by 4 feet deep, or usually a stack of wood containing 128 cubic feet (cu ft). The imperial cord enclosed 128 cu ft.

== France, Belgium, Luxembourg ==
Before 1795, prior to metrication, the French-speaking countries of France, Belgium, and Luxembourg used the corde as a unit of volume. Its value varied from 2 to 5 steres (71 to 177 ft^{3}; 2.0 to 5.0 m^{3}), depending on the region.

== See also ==
- Board foot
- Cubic ton
- Forest product
- Hoppus foot
- Imperial units
- List of unusual units of measurement
- Measurement Canada
  - Measurement Information Division of Industry Canada
- Standard (timber unit)
- Units of measurement
