= Going the Distance =

Going the Distance can refer to the following:

- Going the distance (boxing), a boxing expression for fighting a full bout without being knocked out
- Going the Distance (1979 film), a 1979 Canadian documentary film about the 1978 Commonwealth Games
- Going the Distance (2004 film), a 2004 Canadian teen comedy film
- Going the Distance (2010 film), a 2010 American romantic comedy film starring Drew Barrymore and Justin Long
- "The Distance" (Cake song), a single by the band Cake
- "Go the Distance", a song from the 1997 Disney film, Hercules
- Go the Distance (album), a 2001 album by Walter Trout

== See also ==
- The Distance (disambiguation)
