= Cubic ton =

Measure of volume

The cubic ton is a measure of volume. It is considered obsolete.

== Definitions ==
A mass-derived unit of volume is defined by reference to the density of some material. One common such material is water, used in multiple units. For the cubic ton, the situation is more complex—there are different cubic tons for different materials.

The 1964 Reader's Digest Great Encyclopaedic Dictionary gave the following ton-derived volumes:

- Timber, 40 cubic feet or 480.0 bd ft or 1.133 m^{3}
- Stone, 16 cubic feet (0.453 m^{3})
- Salt, 42 US bushels (1.480 m^{3})
- Lime, 40 US bushels (1.410 m^{3})
- Coke, 28 US bushels (0.99 m^{3})
- Wheat, 20 US bushels (0.705 m^{3})

The nearest thing to a standard cubic ton seems to be the "timber" cubic ton (40 cubic feet or 1.133 cubic metres) which is used by freight transport operators in the US.

== Conversions ==
Converting cubic tons (i.e., volumes) to measures of weight presents difficulties because organic materials such as timber vary in density.

Approximate volume conversions, based on a timber cubic ton of 40 cubic feet:

- 1 ton (40 cubic feet) = 1.133 cubic metres
- 1 cubic metre = 0.883 cubic tons (35.32 cubic feet)

== See also ==
- Board foot
- Cord (unit)
- Hoppus
- Gross tonnage
- Net tonnage
- List of unusual units of measurement
- Stere
- Tun (unit)
- Units of measurement
