= Face cord =

Informal unit of volume

A face cord is an informal measurement for stacked firewood, sometimes called a rick.

Width and height is typically the same as a cord (3.6 m^{3}), but the depth can vary. The front face is the same as a cord 4 by 8 feet (1.2 by 2.4 m), hence the name. The depth is generally 16 inches (410 mm) (for use in residential fireplaces) but can be anything from 12 to 32 inches (300 to 810 mm).

This results in a volume of 32 to 85 cubic feet (0.91 to 2.41 m^{3}). In the United States, several states only allow wood to be sold by the cord or fractions of a cord, to avoid confusion among consumers.

The wood should be stacked "racked and well stowed" – meaning stacked so that the wood is parallel, and air gaps are minimized. It should not be cross-stacked (alternating directions), as this adds considerable empty space to the stack.

== Common volumes for a face cord ==
- 4 feet x 8 feet x 12 inches = 1/4 cord (32 cubic feet)
- 4 feet x 8 feet x 16 inches = 1/3 cord (42.66 cubic feet)
- 4 feet x 8 feet x 24 inches = 1/2 cord (64 cubic feet)
