= Faggot (unit) =

Archaic unit for bundles of sticks

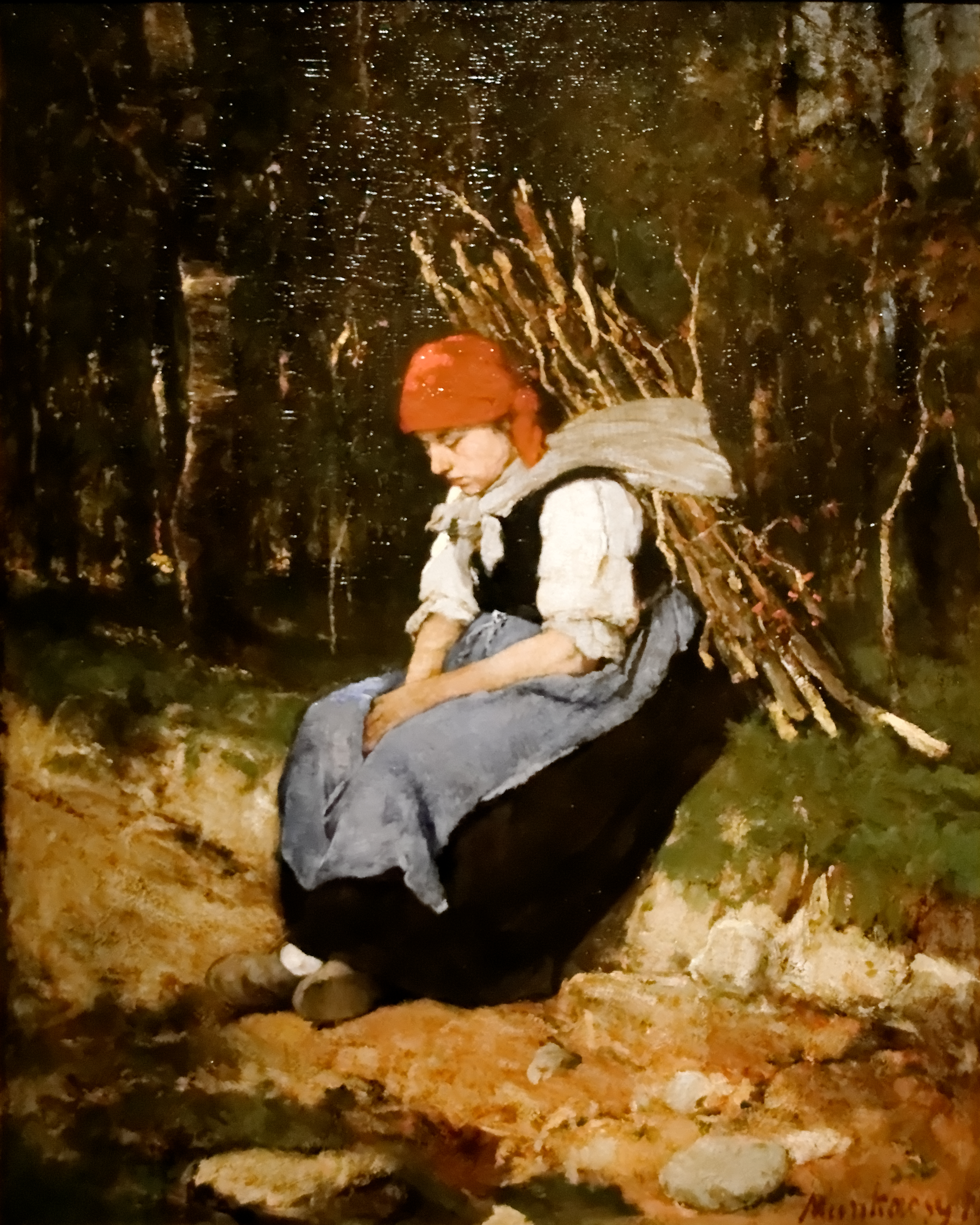
Woman Carrying a Faggot, Mihály Munkácsy

A faggot, in the meaning of "bundle", is an archaic English unit applied to bundles of certain items. Alternate spellings in Early Modern English include fagate, faget, fagett, faggott, fagot, fagatt, fagott, ffagott, and faggat. A similar term is found in other languages (e.g. Latin: fascis).

== Background ==
Sometimes called a short faggot, a faggot of sticks equals a bundle of wood sticks or billets that is 3 feet (90 cm) in length and 2 feet (60 cm) in circumference. The measurement was standardised in ordinances by 1474. A small short faggot was also called a nicket. A brush-faggot (sometimes shortened to brush) was a bundle of similar size made of brushwood.

A long faggot of sticks equals a bundle larger than 3 feet (90 cm) long. In a book on slang used at Winchester College fire-dogs were fire baskets (andirons) that could hold long faggots, and half-faggots were smaller andirons that could only hold short faggots and were later converted for use with coal.

A long faggot was also called a kidd faggot, kid, kide, or kidde being Middle English for firewood in bundles.

A fascine (or bavin) is a type of long faggot which is approximately 13 to 20 feet (4 to 6 m) long and 8 to 9 inches (20 to 23 cm) in diameter and used to maintain earthworks such as trenches.

A faggot was also a unit of weight used to measure iron or steel rods or bars totaling 120 pounds (54 kg).

== See also ==
- Faggot (food)
- Faggot
- Cord (unit)
- Fasces
- Stere
