= Cubic fathom =

Shipping measure for pit props

A cubic fathom or intaken piled fathom (IPF) was a measure of volume used for the shipment of pit props. A fathom was six feet and so this was equivalent to 216 cubic feet.

== See also ==
- Board foot
- Standard (timber unit)
