= Honami (name) =

Honami (written: 穂南, 保奈美 or 穂奈美) is a feminine Japanese given name. Notable people with the name include:

- Honami Maeda (前田 穂南, born 1996), Japanese long-distance runner
- Honami Mizuochi (水落 穂南, born 1993), Japanese weightlifter
- Honami Suzuki (鈴木 保奈美, born 1966), Japanese actress
- Honami Tajima (田島 穂奈美, born 1988), Japanese actress
- Honami Tsukiji (築地 保奈美, born 1989), Japanese volleyball player

Honami (written: 穂波 or 本阿弥) is also a Japanese surname. The two versions shown here are quite distinct and have different pronunciations: the second is more normally romanized Hon'ami. Notable people with the surname include:

- Hon'ami Kōetsu (本阿弥 光悦, 1558–1637), Japanese craftsman, potter, lacquerer, and calligrapher
- Shūko Honami (本阿弥 周子, born 1950), Japanese actress
- Yukine Honami (穂波 ゆきね), Japanese manga artist

Honami is also a name for feminine fictional characters. Names like Honami appear in Japanese video games, manga, anime, etc. Notable characters include:

- Honami Mochizuki from the mobile rhythm game Hatsune Miku: Colorful Stage!
- Honami Ichinose from the light novel series Classroom of the Elite
- Honami Sakurai from the web novel series The Irregular at Magic High School
- Honami Hodoshima from the stealth action game Yandere Simulator
- Honami Yamamoto from the survival racing game Distance
