= Edward Hoppus =

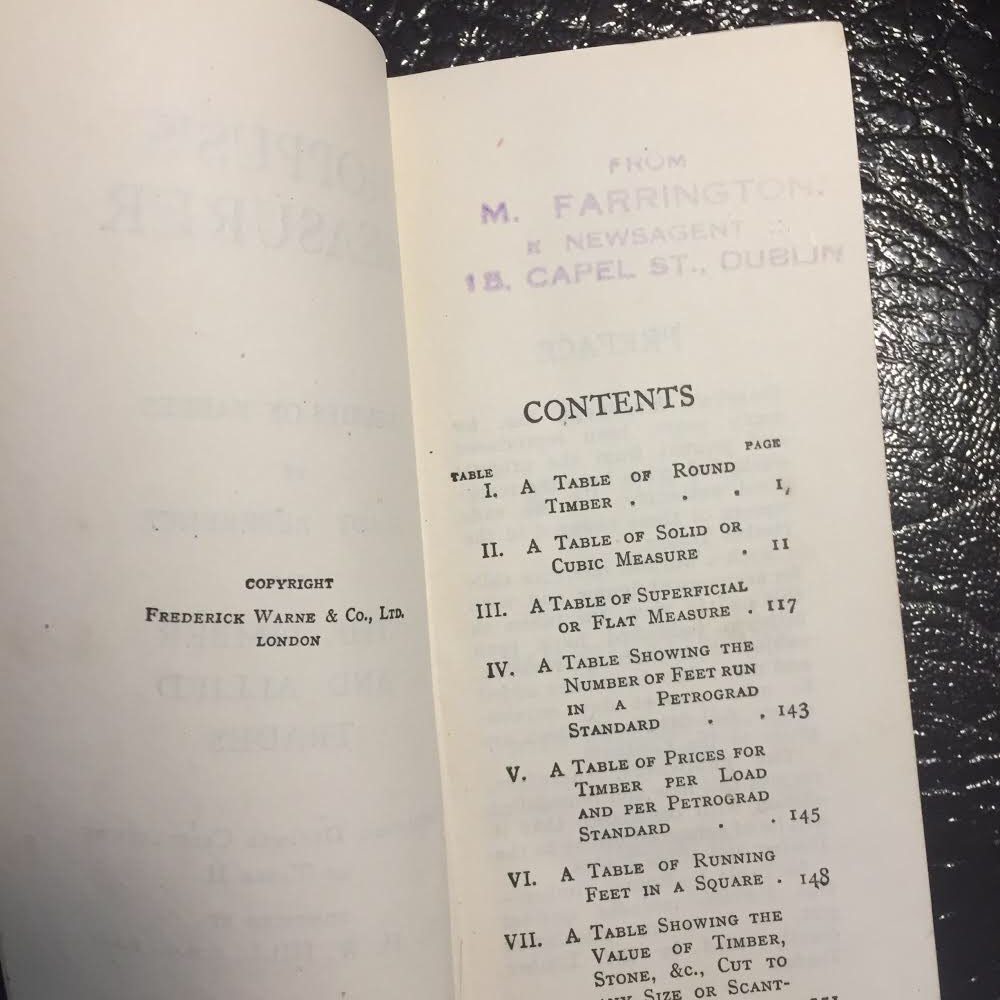
Table of contents of a reprint of Hoppus’ book

Edward Hoppus was an English surveyor who introduced the Hoppus unit of measure. The hoppus measures the solid content and value of any piece of timber, stone, or other building material which is square or round.

Hoppus' book, Hoppus's Measurer: A Book of Early Wood Frame Construction Tables & Guides for the Mathematically Disinclined, was first published in 1736 as The Hoppus's Measurer, or Measuring Made Easy to the Meanest Capacity.

== Publications ==
- Hoppus, E. (1737). The Gentleman's and Builder's Repository: Or, Architecture Display’d. Containing the Most Useful and Requisite Problems in Geometry. .... The Whole Embellished, ... with Eighty-four Plates, ... The Designs Regulated and Drawn by E. Hoppus, ... and Engraved by B. Cole. ... London: C. Hitch; J. Hodges; and B. Cole.
- Hoppus, E. (1738). Practical Measuring Made Easy to the Meanest Capacity, by a New Set of Tables ... Printed, and sold by E. Wicksteed.
- Hoppus, E. (1837). Hoppus's Tables for Measuring, Or, Practical Measuring Made Easy: By a New Set of Tables ... Longman and Company.
- Palladio, A., Hoppus, E., & Cole, B. (1736). Andrea Palladio's Architecture in Four Books ...: The Whole Containing 226 [i.e. 222] Folio Copper Plates. Benjn. Cole engraver the corner of Kings-Head-court, near Fetter-lane, Holbourn, & John Wilcox opposite the New church in the Strand.
