= Hoppus =

Unit of volume

The hoppus cubic foot (or "hoppus cube" or "h cu ft") was the standard volume measurement used for timber in the British Empire and countries in the British sphere of influence before the introduction of metric units. It is still used in the hardwood trade in some countries. This volume measurement was developed to estimate what volume of a round log would be usable timber after processing, in effect attempting to ‘square’ the log and allow for waste. The hoppus ton (HT) was also a traditionally used unit of volume in British forestry. One hoppus ton is equal to 50 hoppus feet or 1.8027 cubic meters. Some shipments of tropical hardwoods, especially shipments of teak from Myanmar (Burma), are still stated in hoppus tons.

== History ==
The English surveyor Edward Hoppus introduced the unit in his 1736 manual of practical calculations. The tables include reference to stone as well as timber, as stone can similarly suffer wastage during processing into regular pieces.

== Calculation of timber volume in round logs ==
The following calculation can be used to estimate the usable timber in round logs using a "girth tape" that is calibrated in "quarter-girth inches" (e.g. that shows "12" when measuring a 48-inch-circumference log):

Hoppus Volume (h ft) = ("Quarter Girth" (in))^{2} × Length (ft) / 144 = (circumference (ft) / 4)^{2} × Length (ft)

=== Equivalents ===
- 1 h ft = 1.273 ft^{3}
- 27.74 h ft = 1 m^{3}
- 1 h ft = 0.03605 m^{3}

== See also ==
- Board foot
- Cord (unit)
- Cubic ton
- List of unusual units of measurement
- Units of measurement
