= The Distance =

The Distance may refer to:

- The distance (boxing), type of boxing match

== Film and TV ==
- "The Distance" (The O.C.), a second season TV episode of The O.C.
- "The Distance" (The Walking Dead), a fifth season TV episode of The Walking Dead
- The Distance, a 2002 novel by Eddie Muller

== Music ==
- The Distance (Bob Seger album), 1982
- The Distance (Taylor Hicks album), 2009
- The Distance, a 1987 album by Geoff Moore; also the name of Moore's backing band
- The Distance, a 2021 EP by Totally Enormous Extinct Dinosaurs
- "The Distance" (Cake song), 1996
- "The Distance" (Mariah Carey song), 2018, featuring Ty Dolla Sign
- "The Distance", a song by Bon Jovi from the 2002 album Bounce
- "The Distance", a song by Live from the 1999 album The Distance to Here
- "The Distance", a song by Aly & AJ from the 2017 EP Ten Years

== See also ==
- Distance (disambiguation)
