= Board foot =

Unit of measurement

board foot
- Unit of: Volume
- Symbol: FBM

Conversions
1 FBM in ...	... is equal to ...
- SI base units: ≈0.002359737 m^{3}
- US Customary: 1/12 ft^{3}

The board foot or board-foot is a unit of measurement for the volume of lumber in the United States and Canada. It equals the volume of a board that is one foot (30.5 cm) in length, one foot in width, and one inch (2.54 cm) in thickness, or exactly 2.359737216 liters. Board foot can be abbreviated as FBM (for "foot, board measure"), BDFT, or BF. A thousand board feet can be abbreviated as MFBM, MBFT, or MBF. Similarly, a million board feet can be abbreviated as MMFBM, MMBFT, or MMBF.

Until the 1970s, in Australia and New Zealand, the terms super foot and superficial foot were used with the same meaning.

== Description ==
One board foot equals:

- 1 ft × 1 ft × 1 in
- 12 in × 12 in × 1 in
- 12 ft × 1 in × 1 in
- 144 in^{3}
- 1/12 ft^{3}
- ≈ 2,360 cubic centimeters
- ≈ 2.360 liters
- ≈ 0.002360 cubic meters or steres
- 1/1980 Petrograd Standard of board

== Usage ==
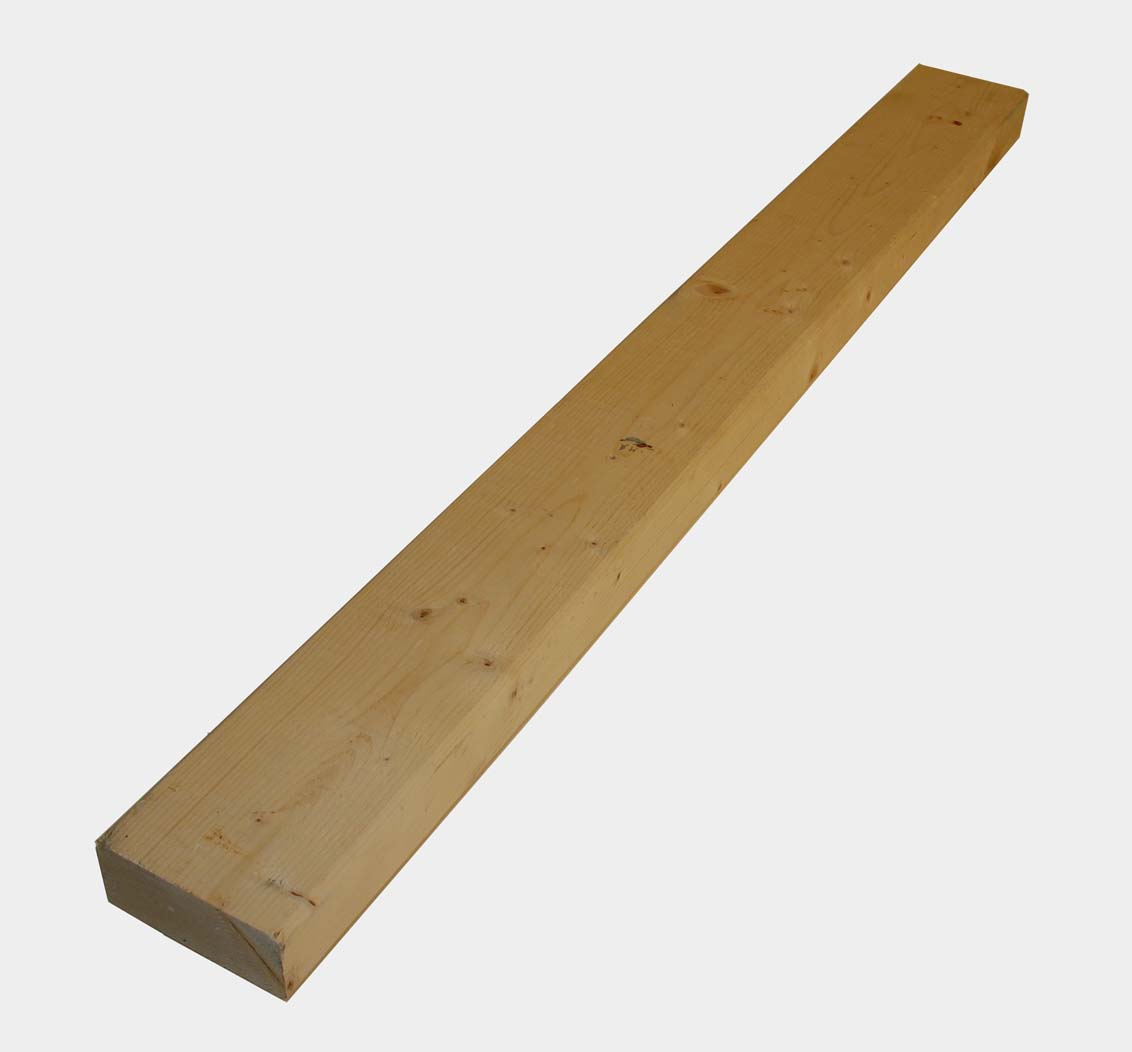
A common two by four board

The board foot is used to measure both rough (unprocessed) lumber and planed (surfaced) lumber. Rough lumber is measured before drying and planing, using its full sawn dimensions. Planed lumber, such as standard softwood "two by four" boards sold at retail, is measured using nominal dimensions—typically 2 by 4 inches (50 mm × 100 mm)—even though the actual size is only about 1 1/2 in × 3 1/2 in (38 mm × 89 mm) after processing. Despite the reduction in size due to drying and planing, nominal dimensions are still used when calculating board feet for surfaced softwood lumber. This convention simplifies pricing and standardization but may result in board footage values that do not reflect the true volume of wood in the final product. Essentially, the nominal dimensions assume a larger volume than the actual board contains, which is especially relevant when estimating material needs or costs. For planed lumber, board footage is calculated using the nominal width and thickness, and the actual length of the board. This reflects the lumber's original rough size before drying and surfacing. For rough lumber, board footage is calculated using the actual width, thickness, and length of the board.

See dimensional lumber for a full explanation of nominal versus actual dimensions. Briefly, for softwoods:

- Subtract 1/4 inch (6 mm) from nominal sizes under 2 inches,
- Subtract 1/2 inch (13 mm) from nominal sizes between 2 and 8 inches,
- Subtract 3/4 inch (19 mm) for nominal sizes over 8 inches.

The system is less complex for hardwoods, because actual board measurements are used.

Board feet can also be used a measure for the volume of logs, namely the estimated total volume of lumber that will result once a sawlog is processed on a sawmill. A variety of formulas and tables, for instance the Doyle Log Rule, exist to calculate this for a log based on its diameter and length, taking into account taper, saw kerf, and waste from cutting.

== See also ==
- Lumber#Dimensional lumber
- Metrication in Canada
- Cord (unit)
- Cubic ton
- Forest product
- Hoppus foot
- Imperial units
- List of unusual units of measurement
- Measurement Canada
  - Measurement Information Division of Industry Canada
- Standard (timber unit)
- Stere
- United States customary units
- Units of measurement
- Weights and Measures Act (Canada)
