= Standard (timber unit) =

Shipping measure for timber boards

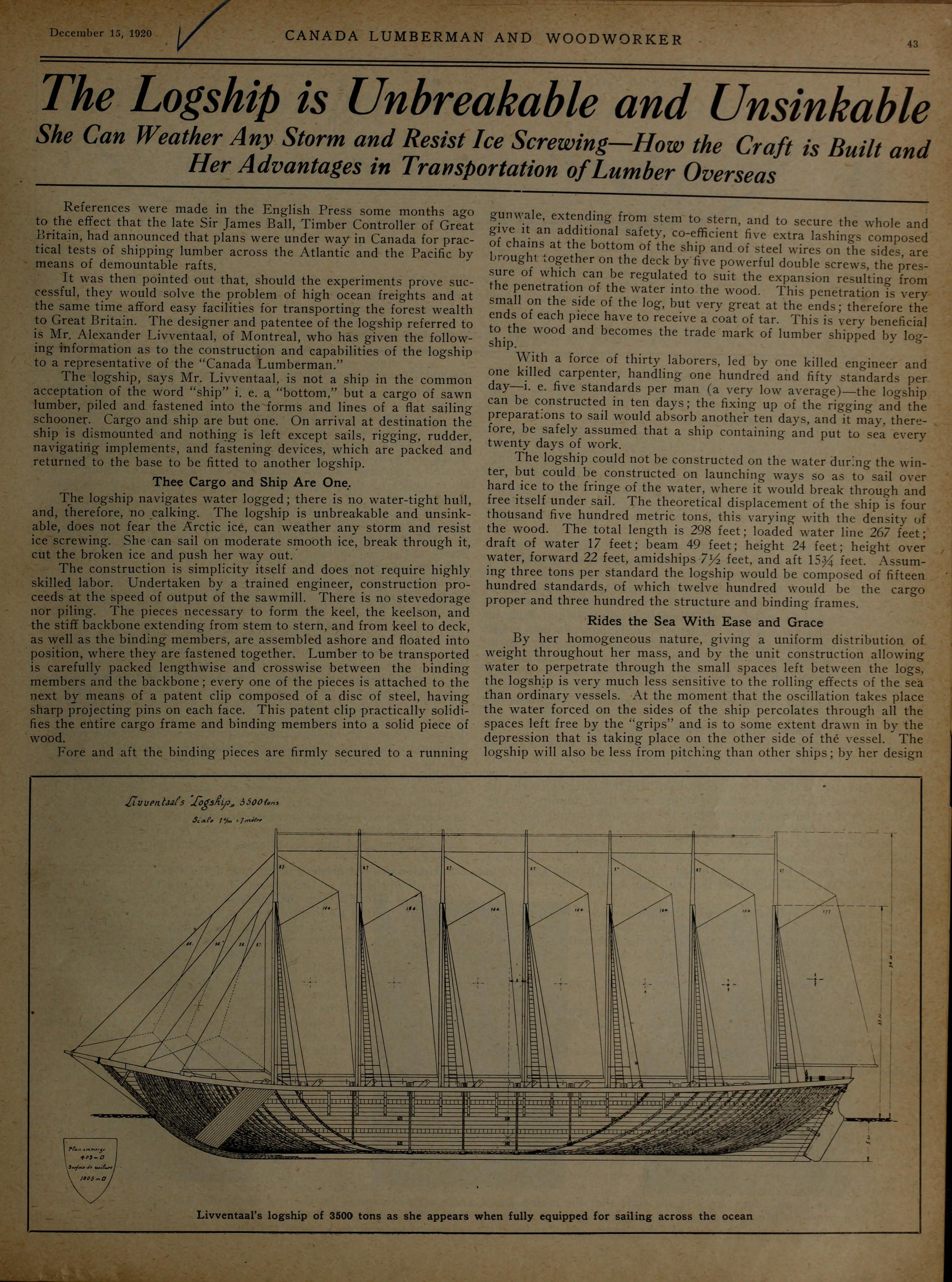
Proposed 1920 logship "composed of fifteen hundred standards, of which twelve hundred would be the cargo proper and three hundred the structure and binding frames."

A standard or standard hundred was a measure of timber used in trade.

The measure varied in number, size and composition from country to country so the term is usually preceded by the region or port of origin. The countries of the Baltic region were major producers and exporters of timber, and used their local measure for trade with other countries such as Britain. The hundred in the term standard hundred was usually a long hundred, meaning 120 pieces, but the word hundred was often dropped, leaving simply standard to mean "the local standard number of pieces, each in the local standard dimensions". The timber would be typically called battens (7 inches wide), deals (above 7, usually 9 inches wide) and planks (11 inches wide); boards were under 2 inches thick.

The standard hundred of the Russian capital of Saint Petersburg was 120 boards which were 12 feet long, 1 1/2 inches thick and 11 inches wide – a volume of 165 cubic feet. The city changed its name to Petrograd when the First World War started in 1914 and so the unit was then known as the Petrograd Standard or PSH (Petrograd Standard Hundred). This unit also used the spelling Petersburgh.

The Christiania standard was 5/8 of the Petersburg standard, making it 103.125 cubic feet.

The Swedish standard hundred was 121 boards of 14 feet long, 3 inches thick and 9 inches wide, making 317.625 cubic feet.

The Norwegian standard hundred was 120 boards of 12 feet long, 3 inches thick and 9 inches wide, making 270 cubic feet.

The British standard hundred for battens was 120 battens of 12 feet long, 2 1/2 inches thick and 7 inches wide, making 175 cubic feet.

The Quebec standard hundred was 100 boards of 12 feet long, 2 1/2 inches thick and 11 inches wide, making 275 cubic feet.

The American standard hundred was 120 deals of 12 feet long, 2 inches thick and 12 inches wide, making 240 cubic feet.

The deals for decking sold in the ports of Danzig and Memel were planks of 40 feet long, 3 inches thick and 1 foot wide. A standard hundred of 120 would be 1200 cubic feet.

Timber was an important import for Britain and the supply was affected by the Napoleonic Wars. North America replaced Scandinavia as a source and the annual volume of trade in standards during this period changed as follows (standards per year):

| Years | Baltic | North America |
|---|---|---|
| 1788–92 | 73,132 | 866 |
| 1803–07 | 77,392 | 5,511 |
| 1829–33 | 40,927 | 134,227 |

== See also ==
- Board foot
- Intaken piled fathom
- List of obsolete units of measurement
