= Measurement Canada =

- Mesures Canada

Agency overview
- Formed: August 6, 1996
- Jurisdiction: Government of Canada
- Headquarters: Ottawa, Ontario, Canada
- Motto: Fair Measure for All
- Employees: 278 (2015-16)
- Annual budget: C$ 27 m (2015-16)
- Minister responsible: Melanie Joly, Minister of Industry
- Agency executive: Diane Allan, President
- Parent department: Innovation, Science and Economic Development Canada
- Website: https://mc.ic.gc.ca

Measurement Canada (French: Mesures Canada) is a special operating agency of the Government of Canada's Innovation, Science and Economic Development portfolio, in the Small Business, Tourism and Marketplace Services sector. The agency's mandate is to ensure the integrity and accuracy of trade measurement in Canada, through enforcement and administration of federal acts and regulations.

Measurement Canada approves, inspects, and certifies measurement instruments, and investigates and resolves complaints regarding inaccurate measurement. In 2015–16, Measurement Canada issued 23,000 measurement standards certificates, performed over 4,000 oversight activities on the inspections done by Authorized Service Providers and approximately 15,000 marketplace monitoring inspections, as well as investigated over 1,400 complaints. For 2016, the compliance rate for accuracy of the measuring devices subject to mandatory inspection frequencies was 93%.

== Legislation ==
Legislation Measurement Canada is responsible for administering and enforcing include:

- Weights and Measures Act
- Electricity and Gas Inspection Act

As well as the Fairness at the Pumps Act, which was passed in 2011, amending the above acts, putting in place a mandatory inspection regime at gas pumps, and raising monetary penalties for non-compliance.

== Organization ==
Measurement Canada provides services in five core areas:

1. Calibration of Measurement Standards
2. Approval of Measuring Instruments
3. Inspection, Certification and Enforcement
4. Dispute and Complaint Investigation
5. Oversight of Authorized Service Providers

Measurement Canada is divided into five directorates, three regional offices and 16 offices located across Canada, and its headquarters and laboratory test facilities are located in Ottawa.

Measurement Canada uses Authorized Service Providers to assist it in fulfilling its mandate.

== See also ==
- Custody transfer
