= Distance (video game) =

2018 racing game

- Steam cover art
- Developer: Refract Studios
- Publisher: Refract Studios
- Director: Jordan Hemenway
- Engine: Unity
- Platforms: Windows; PlayStation 4; PlayStation 5
- Release: September 18, 2018; July 19, 2024 (PlayStation)
- Genre: Racing
- Modes: Single-player, multiplayer

Distance is a 2018 science fiction racing game by Refract Studios for Microsoft Windows and PlayStation consoles. Following a crowdfunding campaign and an early access launch in 2014, it was released in September 2018 for Windows and in July 2024 for PlayStation 5 and PlayStation 4.

== Gameplay ==
Distance is an atmospheric racing platformer where the player controls a futuristic vehicle through a neon, Cyberpunk like world. The game features mechanics such as jumping, flying, wall riding and boosting, and doing these actions causes the player's car to heat up. If the car is too overheated, it will reach critical levels and explode. To cool the car back to normal temperatures, the player has to drive through a checkpoint, which can be found throughout a level. There are multiple courses that feature obstacles such as saws, lasers, and collapsing roads that destroys the player's car on collision. Distance has a multiplayer mode where players can race against other players in courses online, and an Arcade time trial mode where players can speedrun individual levels as quickly as possible and compete in the leaderboards. Additionally, the game also includes an in-built level editor that allows players to create their own unique levels.

== The destruction of Nitronic City ==
Nitronic City was a major urban settlement whose destruction was caused by the corruption of the Sentinel Tower, a physical structure that also functioned as a control system. Following its corruption, the tower became sentient and turned against the city, resulting in widespread destruction and loss of life.

Although some residents died during the catastrophe, most of the population evacuated to a space station known as The Array.

Despite the destruction of Nitronic City, the rest of Earth remained intact. The government concealed this fact from the evacuated population, using propaganda to convince the residents that the entire planet had been devastated. This deception allowed the government to maintain the false narrative that Earth was no longer habitable.

One of the most prominent elements of this propaganda campaign was a billboard bearing the phrase "Remember Her". The message referred to Earth, which the government portrayed as a lost home that the population could only remember. The billboard was distributed throughout The Array, becoming a widespread symbol of the government's fabricated account of Earth's destruction. The residents largely accepted this narrative without questioning its validity.

== Life aboard The Array ==
The Array functioned as a self-contained urban environment, containing residential areas, factories, workplaces, and other facilities required to sustain its population. Despite being situated in space, the station was organized to resemble a conventional city.

Transportation throughout The Array relied on vehicles known as Spectrum Units. These vehicles employed a consciousness-transfer process that allowed residents to inhabit their assigned cars without physically driving them in the conventional sense.

To use a Spectrum Unit, an individual would sit in a designated chair and undergo a transfer process described as feeling similar to being electrocuted. Upon completion, the individual's consciousness would awaken inside their assigned vehicle. At the destination, the individual would transfer back into their original body.

The process made Spectrum Units an integral part of everyday transportation aboard The Array.

== The infection of The Array ==
At an unspecified point after the evacuation from Nitronic City, a digital virus infiltrated The Array. The infection ultimately spread throughout the station and resulted in the apparent extinction of its living population.

The virus may have been the same digital entity responsible for corrupting the Sentinel Tower in Nitronic City. However, this connection has not been definitively established, and the relationship between the two incidents remains uncertain.

Whereas the Sentinel Tower catastrophe resulted in the destruction of Nitronic City and the evacuation of most of its inhabitants, the infection aboard The Array appeared to eliminate all remaining life on a much larger scale.

The virus consequently appeared to have achieved its objective, leaving The Array without any surviving inhabitants.

== The antivirus ==
Despite the apparent extinction of The Array's population, the player character emerges as an exception to the catastrophe. Accompanied by their Spectrum Unit, the player serves as an antivirus against the digital infection that has overtaken the station.

The reason for the player's antivirus status remains unknown. Neither the nature of this role nor the circumstances that allow the player to oppose the virus have been established.

The player and their vehicle form the central means through which the infection can be confronted. Their emergence raises questions about the virus's apparent victory and the possibility of restoring The Array.

The relationship between the infection, the Sentinel Tower, and the player's unusual role remains a central unresolved element of the narrative.

== Development and release ==
Distance was developed by Refract Studios, founded by former DigiPen Institute of Technology students in Seattle. The game is as a spiritual successor to Nitronic Rush, a student project developed at DigiPen and released in 2011, which intellectual property is owned by DigiPen. In October 2012, Refract launched a Kickstarter crowdfunding campaign seeking $125,000 for Distance. It features the addition of a multiplayer mode compared to Nitronic Rush.

The game was released into early access via Steam on December 9, 2014. A PlayStation 4 version was announced on December 2, 2014, and showcased at PlayStation Experience 2015 with PlayStation VR on December 4, 2015. Distance was fully released for Windows on September 18, 2018. PlayStation 5 and PlayStation 4 versions were released on July 19, 2024.

== Reception ==
Reception

Aggregate score
Aggregator	Score
Metacritic	74/100

Review scores
Publication	Score
Gamekult	7/10
CD-Action	5/10

The PC version of Distance received "mixed or average" reviews according to review aggregation website Metacritic. Reviewing the early access version in September 2017, Ali Jones of PCGamesN found the multiplayer to be the best part due to the availability of thousands of courses. Upon release in September 2018, Gamekult noted the delayed development and found it to be an exhilarating racing game.
