= Weights and Measures Act (Canada) =

Canadian law regulating units of measures

The Weights and Measures Act (R.S. 1985; French: Loi sur les poids et mesures) (long title: An Act respecting weights and measures) is a Canadian law governing the units of measurements used in Canada.

Originally passed in 1970 as part of the Government of Canada's plan for metrication of Canada from Imperial measures, it was stopped in 1985 and changes were made to the act. The Metric Commission was created by the act and abolished in 1985.

The act sets forth the regulation of measurements and the commerce conducted using measuring devices. The act provides that the International System of measurement be used with what the act calls "Customary units used with the international system" such as hour, minutes, litres, hectares, tonne or metric ton.

In addition, the act allows usage of what it labels as "Canadian units" (the imperial system), such as miles, inches, imperial gallons, and acres. In SCHEDULE III - section 5, the act also provides for the usage of certain French units in what it labels as UNITS OF MEASUREMENT TO DESCRIBE CERTAIN LAND IN QUEBEC. The five permitted old French units are the foot (the French foot of 12.789 inches), arpent (for both length and area), and perch (for both length and area).

United States customary units are not legal for trade within Canada.

== Units (Schedule II) ==
=== Length ===
unit name		official definition	metric equivalent
English	French	official definition	metric equivalent
mile	mille	1,760 yd	1.609344 km
furlong	furlong	220 yd	201.168 m
rod, pole or perch	perche	5 1/2 yd	5.0292 m
yard	yard or verge	9,144/10,000 m	914.4 mm
foot	pied	1/3 yd	304.8 mm
inch	pouce	1/36 yd	25.4 mm
chain	chaîne	22 yd	20.1168 m
link	chaînon	1/100 chain	201.168 mm

=== Area ===
unit name		official definition	metric equivalent
English	French	official definition	metric equivalent
square mile	mille carré	640 acres	2.589988110336 km^{2}
acre	acre	4,840 sq yd	4,046.856422 m^{2}
square rod	perche carrée	30 1/4 sq yd	25.29285264 m^{2}
square yard	yard carré or verge carrée	a superficial area equal to that of a square each side of which measures one yard	8361.2736 cm^{2}
square foot	pied carré	1/9 sq yd	929.0304 cm^{2}
square inch	pouce carré	1/144 sq ft	6.4516 cm^{2}

=== Volume ===
unit name		official definition	metric equivalent	US Equivalent	
English	French	official definition	metric equivalent	fluid	dry
bushel	boisseau	8 gal	36.36872 L	9.608 US fl gal	8.256 US dry gal
peck	quart de boisseau	2 gal	9.09218 L	2.402 US fl gal	2.064 US dry gal
gallon	gallon	454,609/100,000,000 m^{3}	4.54609 L	1.201 US fl gal	1.032 US dry gal
quart	pinte	1/4 gal	1.1365225 L	1.201 US qt	
pint	chopine	1/8 gal	568.26125 mL	1.201 US pt	
gill	roquille	1/32 gal	142.0653125 mL	4.804 US fl oz	
fluid ounce	once fluide	1/160 gal	28.4130625 mL	0.9608 US fl oz	
fluid dram	drachme fluide	1/8 fl oz	3.5516328125 mL	0.1201 US fl oz	
cubic yard	yard cube or verge cube	a volume equal to that of a cube each side of which measures one yard	764.554857984 dm^{3}		
cubic foot	pied cube	1/27 cu yd	28.316846592 dm^{3}		
cubic inch	pouce cube	1/1,728 cu ft	16.387064 cm^{3}		

=== Mass ===
unit name		official definition	metric equivalent
English	French	official definition	metric equivalent
ton	tonne	2,000 lb	907.18474 kg
cental or hundredweight	quintal	100 lb	45.359237 kg
pound	livre	0.45359237 kg	453.59237 g
ounce	once	1/16 lb or 437 1/2 grains	28.349523 g
dram	drachme	1/16 oz	1.771845195 g
grain	grain	1/7,000 lb	64.79891 mg
precious metals
troy ounce	once troy	480 grains	31.1034768 g
precious stones and gem stones
carat	carat	200 mg	200 mg

== Quebec land measure (Schedule III) ==
unit name	official definition	metric equivalent
foot (French measure or Paris foot)	12.789 inches	≈ 32.48 cm
arpent, as a measure of length	180 feet (French measure)	≈ 58.47 m
arpent, as a measure of area	32 400 square feet (French measure)	≈ 3,418.89 m^{2}
perch, as a measure of length	18 feet (French measure)	≈ 5.85 m
perch, as a measure of area	324 square feet (French measure)	≈ 34.19 m^{2}

== See also ==
- Measurement Canada
- Measurement Information Division of Innovation, Science and Economic Development Canada
- Metric system
- Metrication Ordinance (Hong Kong)
- Units of measurement in France before the French Revolution
- Weights and Measures Act (United Kingdom)
