= Traditional French units of measurement =

French units of measurement before 1789

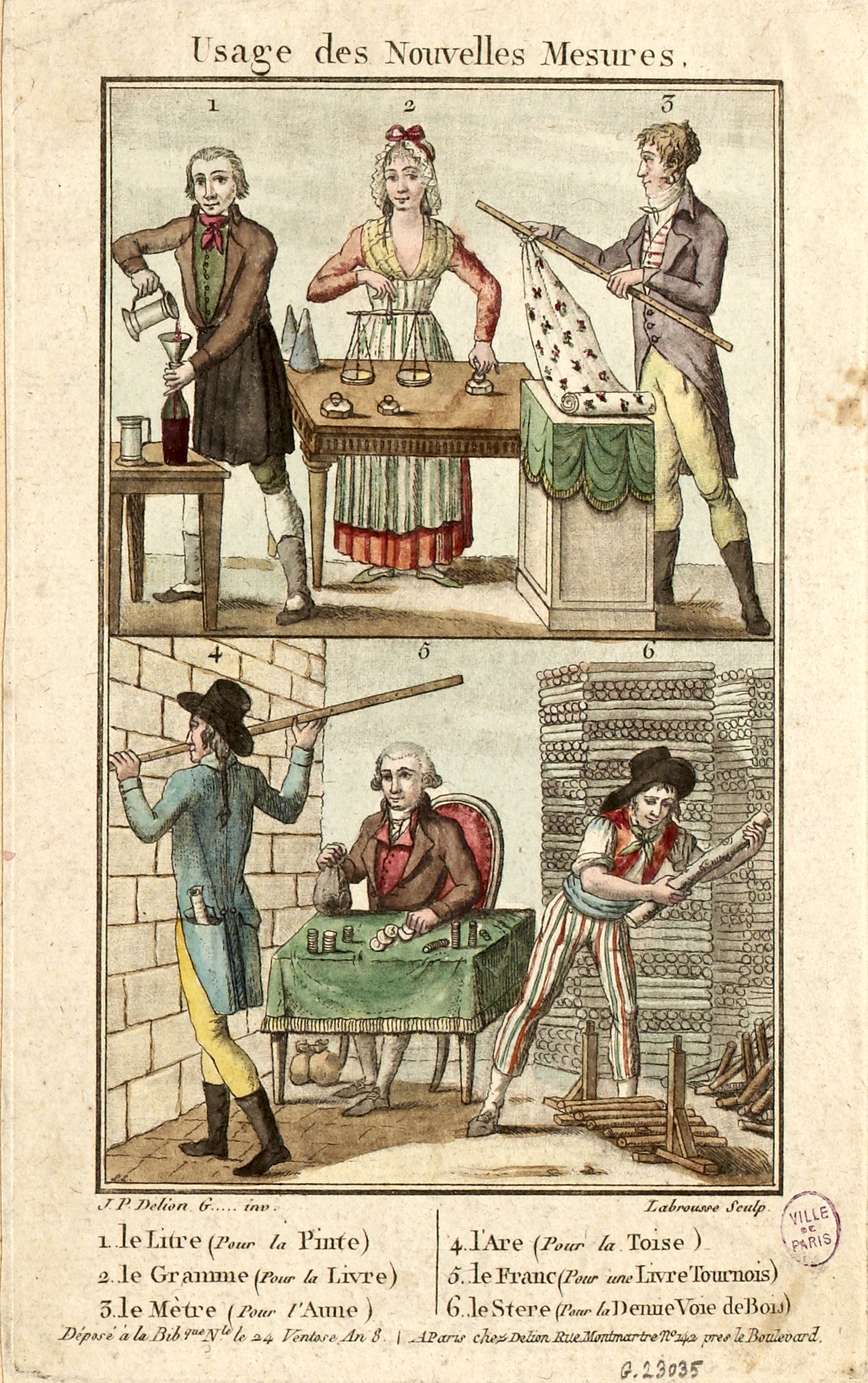
Woodcut dated 1800 illustrating the new decimal units which became the legal norm across all France on 4 November 1800

The traditional French units of measurement prior to metrication were established under Charlemagne during the Carolingian Renaissance. Based on contemporary Byzantine and ancient Roman measures, the system established some consistency across his empire but, after his death, the empire fragmented and subsequent rulers and various localities introduced their own variants. Some of Charlemagne's units, such as the king's foot (French: pied du Roi) remained virtually unchanged for about a thousand years, while others important to commerce—such as the French ell (aune) used for cloth and the French pound (livre) used for amounts—varied dramatically from locality to locality. By the 18th century, the number of units of measure had grown to the extent that it was almost impossible to keep track of them and one of the major legacies of the French Revolution was the dramatic rationalization of measures by the new metric system. The change was extremely unpopular, however, and a metricized version of the traditional units—the mesures usuelles—had to be brought back into use for several decades.

== History ==
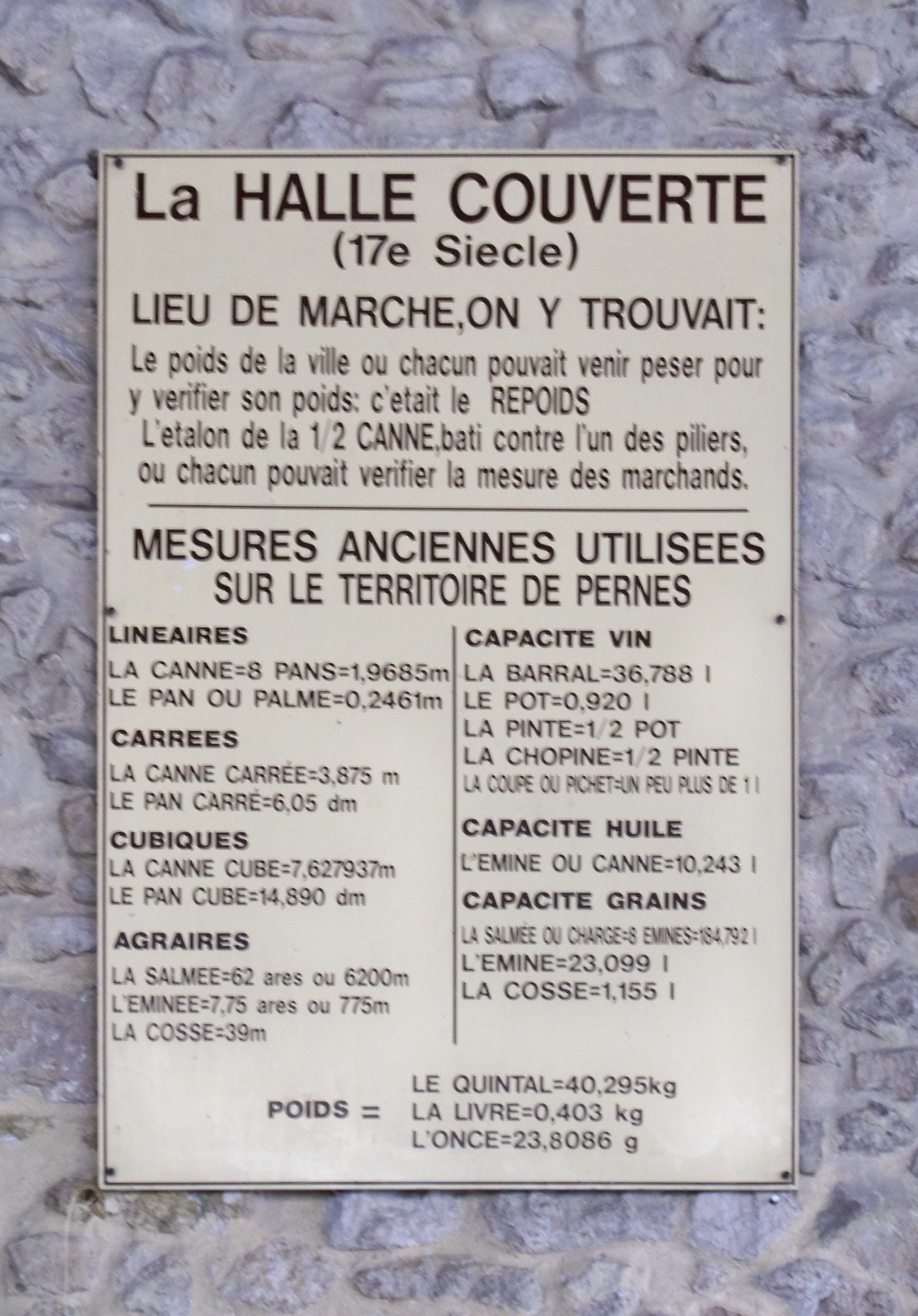
Table of the measuring units used in the 17th century at Pernes-les-Fontaines in the covered market at Provence-Alpes-Côte d'Azur region of southeastern France

Although in the pre-revolutionary era (before 1795) France used a system and units of measure that had many of the characteristics of contemporary English units (or the later Imperial System of units), France still lacked a unified, countrywide system of measurement. Whereas in England Magna Carta had decreed that "there shall be one unit of measure throughout the realm", Charlemagne and successive kings had tried but failed to impose a unified system of measurement in France.

The names and relationships of many units of measure were adopted from Roman units of measure, and many more were added – it has been estimated that there were seven or eight hundred different names for the various units of measure. Moreover, the quantity associated with each unit of measure differed from town to town and even from trade to trade. Some of the differences were large: for example the lieue (league) could vary from 3.268 km in Beauce to 5.849 km in Provence. It has been estimated that on the eve of the Revolution a quarter of a million different units of measure were in use in France. Although certain standards, such as the pied du Roi (the King's foot) had a degree of pre-eminence and were used by savants, many traders chose to use their own measuring devices, giving scope for fraud and hindering commerce and industry.

== Tables of units of measure ==
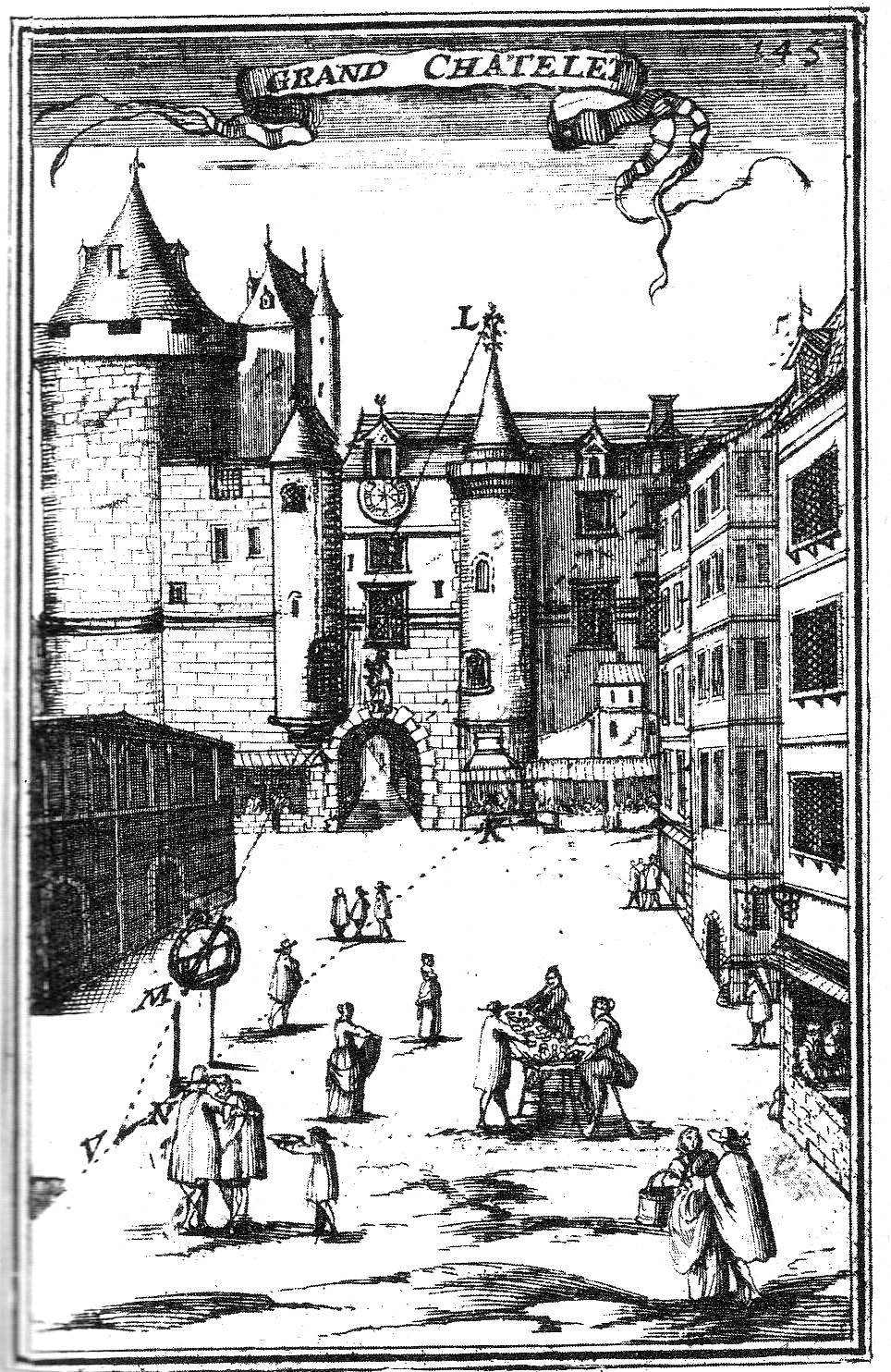
17th-century engraving of the Grand Châtelet

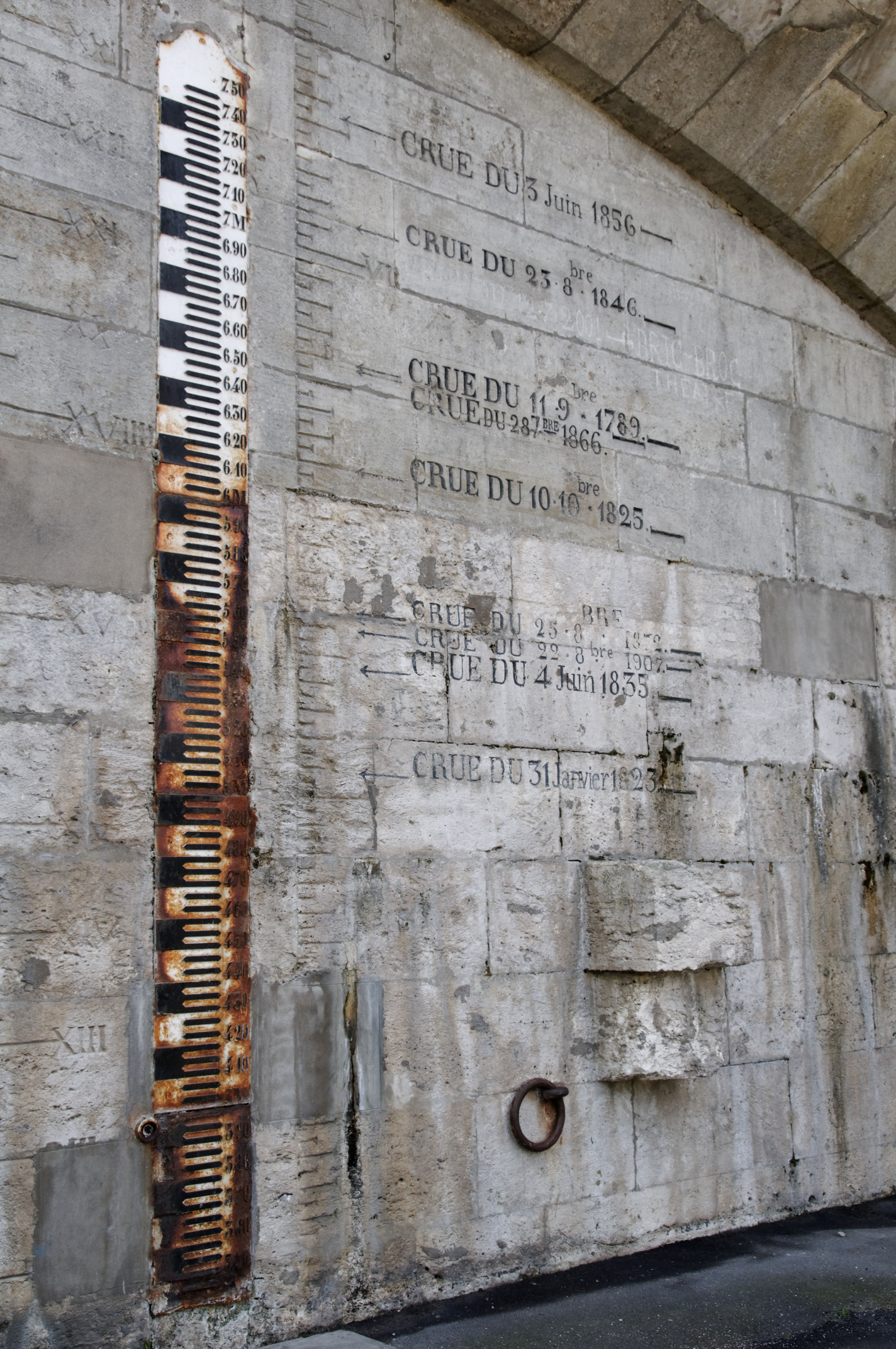
Flood levels at the pont Wilson at Tours in both metres and pied royal

These definitions use the Paris definitions for the coutume of Paris, and definitions for other Ancien régime civil jurisdictions varied, at times quite significantly.

=== Length ===
The medieval royal units of length were based on the toise, and in particular the toise de l'Écritoire, the distance between the fingertips of the outstretched arms of a man, which was introduced in 790 by Charlemagne.

The toise had 6 pieds (feet) each of 326.6 mm (12.86 in). In 1668 the reference standard was found to have been deformed, and it was replaced by the toise du Châtelet which, to accommodate the deformation of the earlier standard, was around 11 mm (0.56%) shorter.

In 1747 this toise was replaced by a new toise of near-identical length – the Toise du Pérou, custody of which was given to l'Académie des Sciences au Louvre.

Although the pouce (inch), pied (foot) and toise (fathom) were fairly consistent throughout most of pre-revolutionary France, some areas had local variants of the toise. Other units of measure such as the aune (ell), the perche (perch or rood), the arpent and the lieue (league) had a number of variations, particularly the aune (which was used to measure cloth).

The loi du 19 frimaire an VIII (Law of 10 December 1799) states that one decimal metre is exactly 443.296 French lines, or 3 pieds 11.296 lignes de la "Toise du Pérou". Thus the French royal foot is exactly 4500/(13 853) metres (about 0.3248 m (12.79 in)). (Note: This can be shown by noting that 27,706 × 16 = 443,296 and that 9 × 16 = 144, the number of lignes in a pied.)

In Quebec, the surveys in French units were converted using the relationship 1 pied (of the French variety, the same word being used for English feet as well) = 12.789 English inches. This makes the Quebec pied very slightly smaller (about 4 parts in one million) than the pied used in France.

Table of length units
Unit	Relative value (pieds)	SI value (approx.)	Imperial value (approx.)	Notes
point	1/1728	0.188 mm	7.401 thou	1/12 of a ligne. This unit is usually called the Truchet point in English. Prior to the French Revolution the Fournier point was also in use. It was 1/6 of a ligne or 1/864 of the smaller French foot.
ligne	1/144	2.256 mm	88.81 thou	1/12 of a pouce. This corresponds to the line, a traditional English unit.
pouce	1/12	27.07 mm	1.066 in	1/12 of a pied du roi. This corresponds to the inch, a traditional English unit.
pied du roi	1	32.48 cm	1.066 ft	Commonly abbreviated to pied, this corresponds to the foot, a traditional English unit. Known in English as the Paris foot (properly a separate, shorter unit), the royal foot, or French foot.
toise	6	1.949 m	6.394 ft, or 2.131 yd	Six pieds du roi. This corresponds to the fathom, a traditional English unit. Unlike the fathom, it was used in both land and sea contexts. The Toise du Chatelet was introduced in 1668 and defined by an iron bar on the Grand Chatelet. This was replaced by the Toise du Perou in 1766.
Paris
perche d'arpent	22	7.146 m	7.815 yd	Related to, but not directly corresponding with, the English perch or rod (which is 16 1/2 feet, approximately three-quarters of the French perche).
arpent	220	71.46 m	78.15 yd	Ten perches.
lieue ancienne	10 000	3.248 km	2.018 miles	This is an old French league, defined as 10 000 (a myriad) pieds. It was the official league in parts of France until 1674.
lieue de Paris	12 000	3.898 km	2.422 miles	This league was defined in 1674 as exactly 2000 toises. After 1737, it was also called the "league of bridges and roads" (lieue des Ponts et des Chaussées).
lieue des Postes	13 200	4.288 km	2.664 miles	This league is 2200 toises or 60 arpents. It was created in 1737.
lieue de 25 au degré	~13 692	4.448 km	2.764 miles	Linked to the circumference of the Earth, with 25 lieues making up one degree of a great circle. (Compare the international nautical mile, of which 60 make one degree; one lieue therefore equaling 2.4 nautical miles.) It was measured by Picard in 1669 to be 2282 toises.
lieue tarifaire	14 400	4.678 km	2.907 miles	This league is 2400 toises. It was created in 1737.
North America
perche du roi	18	5.847 m	6.394 yd	This perch was used in Quebec and Louisiana
arpent (du roi)	180	58.47 m	63.94 yd	Ten perches du roi.
Local
perche ordinaire	20	6.497 m	7.105 yd	This perch was used locally.
arpent (ordinaire)	200	64.97 m	71.05 yd	Ten perches ordinaires.

- The French typographic point, the Didot point, was 1/72 of a French inch, i.e. two royal points. The French pica, called Cicéro, measured 12 Didot points or 12 × 0.376 = 4.512 mm (0.1776 in).

=== Area ===
Table of area units
Unit	Relative value (pieds carrés)	SI value	Imperial value	Notes
pied carré	1	~1055 cm^{2}	~1.136 sq ft	The French square foot
toise carrée	36	~3.799 m^{2}	~40.889 sq ft, or ~4.543 sq yd	The French square fathom
Paris
perche d'arpent carrée	484	~51.07 m^{2}	~61.08 sq yd	This was the main square perch in old French surveying. It is a square 22 pieds du roi on each side.
vergée	12 100	~1277 m^{2}	~1527 sq yd	A square 5 perches on each side, or one quarter of an acre.
acre, or arpent carré	48 400	~5107 m^{2}	~6108 sq yd, or ~1.262 acres	The French acre is a square 10 perches (one arpent) on each side. (Does not exactly correspond to the English acre, which is defined as 43 560 square feet.)
North America
perche du roi carrée	324	~34.19 m^{2}	~40.89 sq yd	This square perch was used in Quebec and Louisiana. It is a square 18 pieds du roi on each side.
vergée (du roi)	8100	~854.7 m^{2}	~1022 sq yd	A square 5 perches du roi on each side.
acre (du roi), or arpent carré	32 400	~3419 m^{2}	~4089 sq yd, or ~0.8448 acres	A square 10 perches du roi on each side. Certain U.S. states have their own official definitions for the (square) arpent, which vary slightly from this value.
Local
perche (ordinaire) carrée	400	~42.21 m^{2}	~50.48 sq yd	This square perch was used locally. It is a square 20 pieds du roi on each side.
vergée (ordinaire)	10 000	~1055 m^{2}	~1262 sq yd	A square 5 perches ordinaires on each side.
acre (ordinaire), or arpent carré	40 000	~4221 m^{2}	~5048 sq yd, or ~1.043 acres	A square 10 perches ordinaires on each side.

=== Volume – liquid measures ===
Table of (liquid) volume units
Unit	Relative value (pintes)	SI value	U.S. value	Imperial value	Notes
roquille	1/32	~29.75 ml			One quarter of a poisson.
poisson	1/8	~119 ml			A measure equal to a half a demiard. There were different sizes based on the commodity measured: poisson de vin (wine), poisson de eau de vie (brandy), or poisson de lait (milk).
demiard	1/4	~238 ml	~0.5 pint		demi in French means "half": in this case, half a chopine, and – coincidentally – also approximately half a US pint [237 ml].
chopine	1/2	~476.1 ml	~1 pint	~0.84 pint	
pinte	1	~952.1 ml	~2.01 pint	~1.68 pint	Although etymologically related to the English unit pint, the French pint is about twice as large. It was the main small unit in common use, and measured 1/36 of a cubic pied du roi.
quade	2	~1.904 L	~0.5 gallon	~0.42 gallon	
velte	8	~7.617 L	~2.01 gallon	~1.68 gallon	a velte was a measuring stick that was inserted into a cask or barrel to determine its depth.
quartaut	72	~68.55 L			9 veltes, or two cubic pieds du roi.
feuillette	144	~137.1 L			
muid	288	~274.2 L			Eight cubic pieds du roi.
cubic
pouce cube	1/48	~19.84 ml			The French cubic inch.
pied cube	36	~34.28 L			The French cubic foot. In ancient times, a cubic foot was also known as an amphora when measuring liquid volume.

=== Volume – dry measures ===
Table of (dry) volume units
Unit	Relative value (boisseaux)	SI value	Imperial value	U.S. value	Notes
litron	1/16	793.5 cm^{3}	0.1745 imp gal	0.1801 U.S. dry gal	1/4 of a quart. The litre is etymologically related to this unit.
quart	1/4	3.174 dm^{3}	0.698 imp gal	0.721 U.S. dry gal	1/4 of a boisseau.
boisseau	1	12.7 dm^{3}	2.8 imp gal	2.9 U.S. dry gal	Although etymologically related to the English unit bushel, the French bushel is about one third the size. A boisseau was defined as 10/27 of a cubic pied du roi.
minot	3	38.09 dm^{3}	8.38 imp gal	8.65 U.S. dry gal	
mine	6	76.17 dm^{3}	16.76 imp gal	17.29 U.S. dry gal	
setier	12	152.3 dm^{3}	33.5 imp gal	34.6 U.S. dry gal	
muid	144	1.828 m^{3}	402 imp gal	415 U.S. dry gal	
cubic
pouce cube	1/640	~19.84 cm^{3}	~1.211 cu in		The French cubic inch.
pied cube	2 7/10	~34.28 dm^{3}	~2,092 cu in		The French cubic foot. Exactly 2.7 boisseaux.

=== Weight ===
The Parisian equivalents (in livres) of 100 local livres in various towns in 1768 (approximations per source)
Abbeville	93–94
Avignon	83
Beaucare	95
Bordeaux	100
Bourg-en-Bresse	96
Dunkirk	87
Lille	87–88
Lyon	87
Marseilles	81
Montepellier	83
Nancy	94–95
Nantes	101–102
La Rochelle	101–102
Rouen (poids de vicomté)	103
Strasbourg (petit poids)	96
Toulouse	84

Differences between the nominal and actual weights (in marcs moyens) in the parts of the pile de Charlemagne as measured by Jean-Charles de Borda
Nominal (marcs)	Error in actual (grains)
20	+1.4
14	+4.5
8	-0.4
4	-2.1
2	-1.0
1 (creux)	-0.7
1 (plein)	-1.7

Charlemagne's system had 12 onces (ounces) to the livre (pound). Between 1076 and 1093 Philip I (1052–1108) instituted a system of poids de marc (mark weight) used for minting coin, with 8 onces to a marc.

Jean II (1319–1364) constructed a new standard of measures, including a livre actuelle ("current" pound, also known as a livre de poids de marc or "mark weight" pound) of 2 marcs, i.e. 16 onces. The Charlemagne 12-ounce livre became known as the livre esterlin ("true" pound) in order to distinguish it. ″Esterlin″ was an Old French word (ca. 1190, Anglo-Norman dialect) that referred to Scottish coin (sterling, or ″denier″). As references cited later on this page show, its application changed over time in accordance with the changing historical context, though it is not current in Modern French.

The livre actuelle could be sub-divided into 2 demi-livres (half-pounds), 4 quarterons, or 8 demi-quarterons. Conversely, there were 100 livres in a quintal (cf. English hundredweight). The fractional parts of an once had different names in Apothecary measure (used in medicine) and measure of precious metals, but the fractional ratios were themselves the same: 1 once was 8 drachme (Apothecary, cf. English dram) or gros; 1 drachme/gros was 3 scruples (Apothecary, cf. English scruple) or deniers, and 1 scruple/denier was 24 grains. This makes 384 deniers in a livre in weight measure, which contrasts with the old monetary livre in France which was divided into 240 deniers.

Jean II's standards are preserved in the Conservatoire Nationale des Arts et Métiers, which also holds a set of later-still physical standards from the 15th century, the so-called pile de Charlemagne. This pile defined the weight of 50 marcs, i.e. 400 onces, and thus 25 livres actuelles, or 33 1/3 livres esterlins. It had been kept in the royal palaces originally. In 1540 François I (1494–1547) had transferred it to the Cour des monnaies, where it had been held in a cabinet with three locks, whose keys had been held separately by the president of the Cour, one of its counsellors, and a clerk.

The thirteen individual pieces that made up the Parisian pile de Charlemagne comprised an outer containing cylinder nominally weighing 20 marcs, and a set of hollow nesting cups within, topped with a filled weight as the smallest piece. The heaviest cups were nominally 14, 8, 4, and 2 marcs, sub-totalling 48 marcs (including the 20 marc outer container); followed by a nominally 1 marc hollow cup which was termed the marc creux (hollow mark); and followed by 6 further cups (4, 2, and 1 onces, and 4, 2, and 1 gros) with a final seventh filled 1 gros weight, all totalling 1 marc, which was termed the marc plein (filled mark).

Unfortunately, the weights were not consistent, with the marc plein not being the same weight as the marc creux, and neither being the same as a mean 1 marc weight determined from the weight of the whole pile. So when the time came to work out the conversion factors between these measures and the metric system, the whole pile was taken to define 50 Parisian standard marcs, and thus 230 400 grains (the number of grains in 50 marcs). Louis Lefèvre‑Gineau initially determined that the metric weight of the whole pile was 12.227 947 5 kg, later corrected to 12.2376 kg, thereby making (by division and rounded to three decimal places) a marc 244.753 g, a livre esterlin 367.129 g, and a livre actuelle 489.506 g. Hence further the (Parisian) once was 30.594 g, the gros/drachme was 3.824 g, the denier/scruple was 1.274 g, and the grain was 0.053 g.

However, the actual weights of the pre-metric measures were nowhere near even this simple. These were just the Parisian standards, and individual provinces, cities, and even guilds, all had their own reference physical standards, which were not checked against one another and which sometimes conflated esterlin and actuelle. For just some examples: the Marseille livre was 399.6 g, the Montpelier one 394.9 g, the Toulon one 465.5 g, and the Toulouse one 413.2 g; with all of the fractional subdivisions having different values accordingly. The Limoges marc was 240.929 g, the Tours one 237.869 g, and the Troyes one 250.050 g.

Furthermore, there were also livres comprising different numbers of onces to both the actuelle and esterlin, including livres of 14, 18, and 20 onces, confusing things yet further. The livre in the poids de table (table weight) systems used in Provence and Languedoc (and a common name for provincial weight systems in general alongside poids de pays, country weight, and poids de ville, town weight) was the same weight as 15 onces or even as low as 13 onces in the Parisian poids de marc, and the livre in the poids de soie (silk weight) system of Lyon was similarly just 15/16 the weight of the Parisian livre. This caused an erroneous belief that these livres comprised 13, 14, or 15 onces, however this was a confusion stemming from the equivalent poids de marc weights, and both poids de table and poids de soie had 16 of their own, lighter, onces and so forth, Rouen had a poids de vicomté system.

== See also ==
- International System of Units
- Jean-Antoine Chaptal
- Mansus
- Mesures usuelles
- Réaumur scale
- Systems of measurement
- Weights and measures
