= Centuria (disambiguation) =

Centuria may refer to:

- Centuria, a Roman military unit
- Centuria (unit of measure), a Roman unit of measure
- Centuria, Wisconsin, a town in Wisconsin
- Centuria (Numidia), an ancient town and titular Catholic see in Africa
- Centuria (manga), a Japanese manga series written and illustrated by Tohru Kuramori
