= 1983 Progressive Conservative leadership election =

Canadian political party leadership election

1983 Progressive Conservative Party leadership election
- June 11, 1983

2,988 delegates in the 1st ballot 1,495 delegate votes needed to win
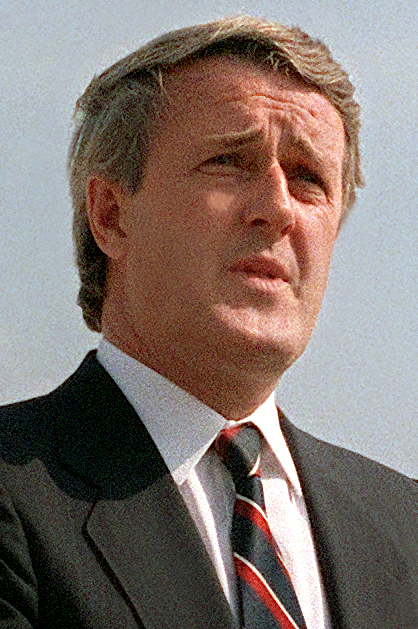

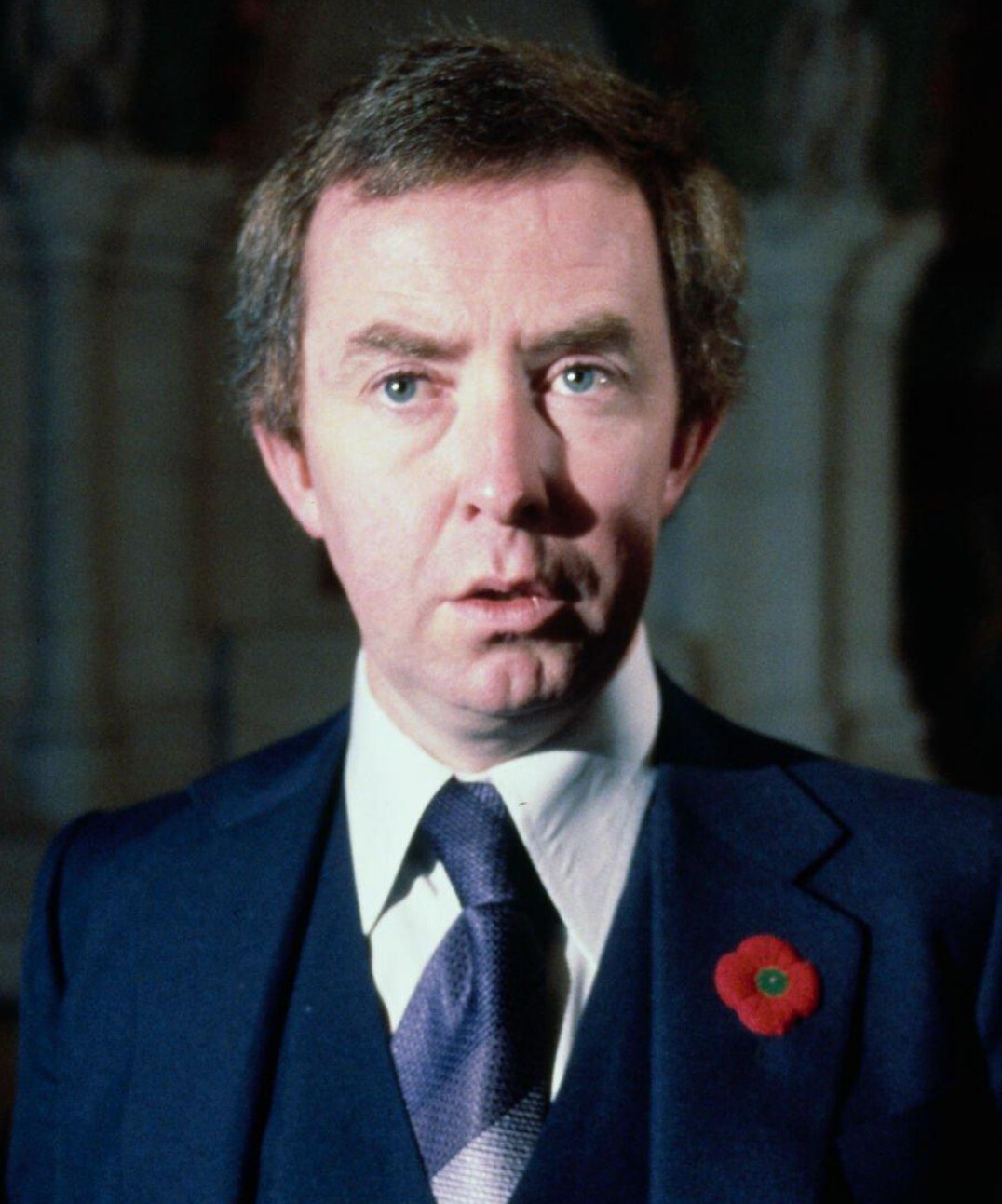

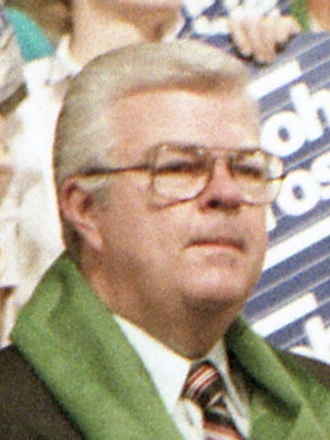
Candidate	Brian Mulroney	Joe Clark	John Crosbie
Fourth ballot delegate count	1,584 (54.4%)	1,325 (45.6%)	Eliminated
First ballot delegate count	874 (29.2%)	1,091 (36.5%)	639 (21.4%)
Leader before election
Erik Nielsen (interim)
Elected Leader
Brian Mulroney

1983 Progressive Conservative leadership election
- Date: June 11, 1983
- Convention: Ottawa Civic Centre, Ottawa, Ontario
- Resigning leader: Joe Clark
- Won by: Brian Mulroney
- Ballots: 4
- Candidates: 7
- Entrance fee: C$5,000
- Spending limit: None

The 1983 Progressive Conservative leadership election was held on June 11, 1983, in Ottawa, Ontario to elect a leader of the Progressive Conservative Party of Canada (PC Party). At the convention, Montreal businessman and lawyer Brian Mulroney was elected leader on the fourth ballot, defeating former prime minister and party leader Joe Clark.

Joe Clark became party leader in 1976 and led the PCs to a minority government in the 1979 federal election, though lost power only nine months later. In 1981, about a third of delegates were dissatisfied with Clark's leadership and were in favour of holding a new leadership convention. Clark refused to resign as leader and stayed on, though in January 1983 still about a third of delegates were unhappy with Clark's leadership. Clark resigned as leader, triggering a leadership election. If he won, he would have been able to demonstrate a 'clear mandate' to the opponents of his leadership.

A big tent party, a politically diverse set of eight candidates ran for the leadership. President of the Iron Ore Company of Canada Brian Mulroney, along with former Bay Street investment executive Michael Wilson and sports owner Peter Pocklington, gained support among the pro-business faction of the party. Clark and former Mayor of Toronto David Crombie were popular among Red Tories while Member of Parliament John Crosbie was popular among the social liberal wing of the PC Party. John A. Gamble and Neil Fraser were lesser-known minor candidates who only had a few followers. Quebec played a major role in the leadership election, as Crosbie and Wilson's chances of victory were hampered by their inability to speak French. Mulroney, on the other hand, was a fluently bilingual native Quebecer who was popular among PC members from Quebec.

After the results of the first round were released, the set of eight candidates was halved to four; Wilson and Pocklington endorsed Mulroney while Gamble and Fraser endorsed Crosbie. In the second round, Crombie was eliminated and endorsed Crosbie. Crosbie, Mulroney and Clark were the three candidates left standing in the third round, and Clark was the only one in the trio who never received an endorsement. After Crosbie placed third, he released his delegates to vote as they chose. In the fourth round, Mulroney was elected leader with 54.4% of the votes cast compared to Clark's 45.6%.

Mulroney later went on to carry the Progressive Conservatives to a massive landslide victory in the 1984 federal election, and a second majority government in 1988. Clark, Crosbie, Crombie and Wilson would all gain prominent positions in Mulroney's cabinet.

== Background ==
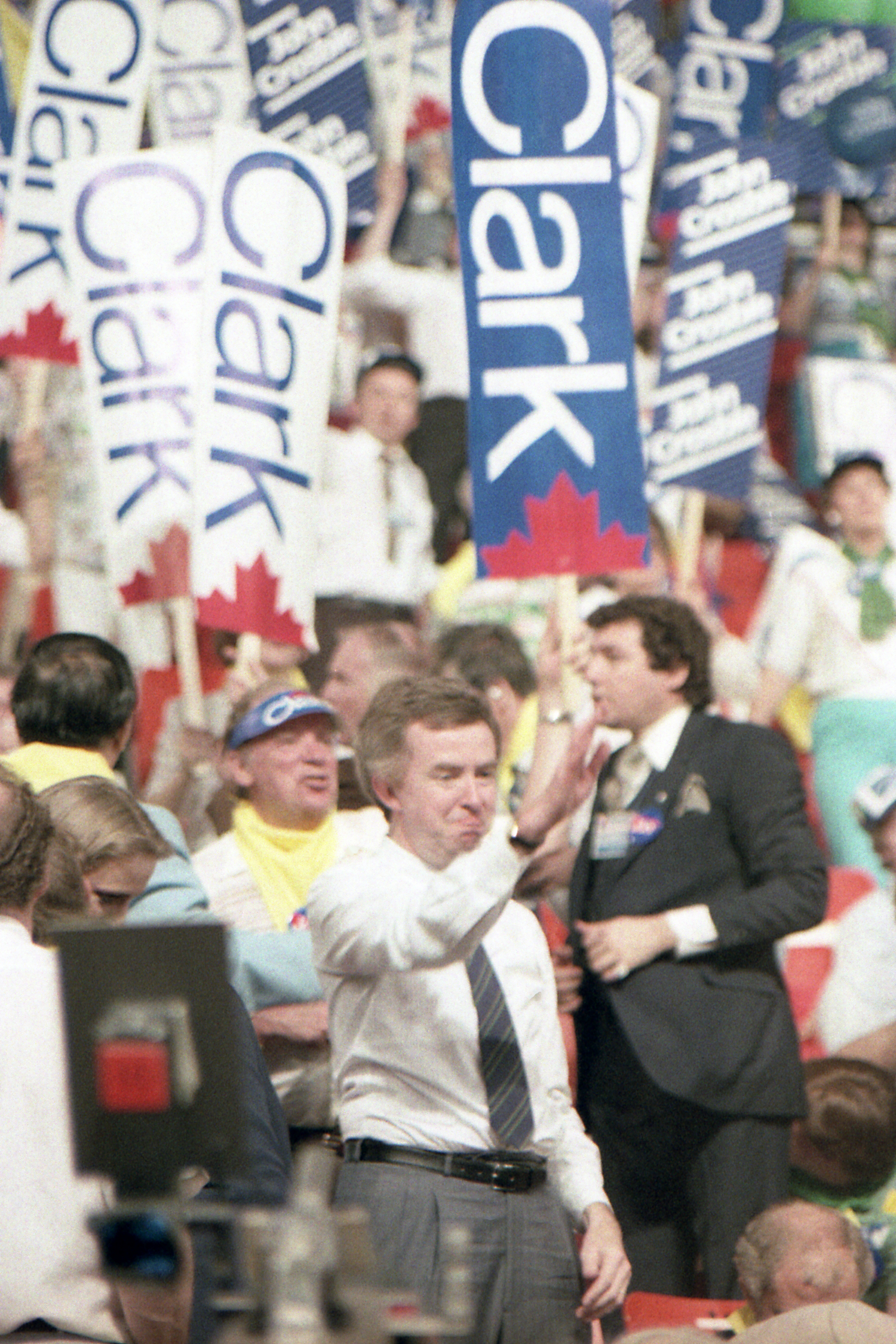
Joe Clark on the floor of the Progressive Conservative leadership convention, 1983.

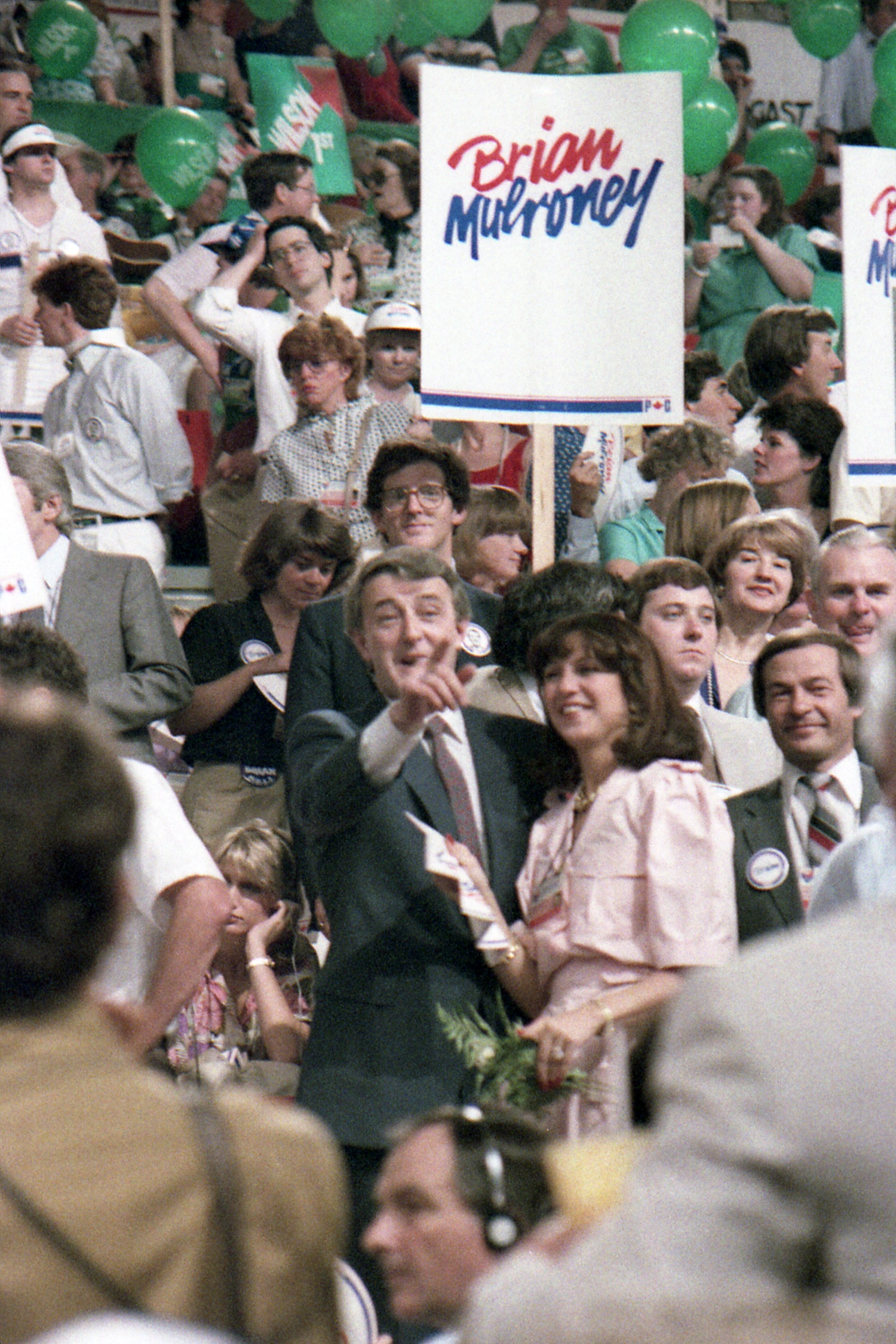
Brian Mulroney on the floor of the Progressive Conservative leadership convention, 1983.

Joe Clark had been leader of the PCs after winning the 1976 leadership convention. While Clark was credited with uniting the PCs after the difficult years under the leadership of Robert Stanfield and with leading the party to victory in the 1979 federal election, the opposition defeated his government over a divisive austerity budget. The Progressive Conservatives lost the subsequent 1980 federal election, and found themselves returned to opposition.

After the 1980 defeat, Clark decided to stay on. At the party's 1981 convention, 33.5% of delegates voted in favour of holding a leadership convention to choose a new leader. This was generally interpreted as being a high level of discontent with Clark's leadership. Clark's internal strategy, led by his Chief of Staff Lowell Murray, was to bring dissidents into the party structure.

Clark's external strategy was to change the party's longstanding strategy of obtaining large wins in English Canada and then appealing to Québec voters with the advantage of holding government to obtain a majority. Believing that the party's base was now too narrow to win government, Clark began an attempt to broaden the party to include women, multicultural communities, and nationalist Quebec voters.

Though the approach began to pay some dividends, including favourable attention in Quebec after the patriation of the Canadian constitution, opponents remained prominent in the party and the national media. They could generally be divided into two groups: the first were not convinced Clark had the ability to win another election, given his personality and the unpopularity of the 1979-80 government. Others within the party maintained that Clark's outreach and moderate policy decisions were aloof from the party's grassroots, which had begun to embrace neoliberal and monetarist reforms that were being pursued in the United Kingdom and United States.

At the party's national convention in Winnipeg in January 1983, the chief issue was again Clark's leadership. The issue mobilized supporters and detractors of Clark to a degree not usually seen at biennial conventions. At the convention 66.9% of the delegates voted against, and 33.1% voted for leadership review. Clark, seeing only a marginal gain in popularity among his party, decided with his advisers that he would resign as leader, and run in the convention to succeed himself. This was seen within his inner circle the only way to drown out the opposition to his leadership, as the previous attempts to reach out to opponents had left the party leadership unable to push back.

After a short rebound after the patriation of the constitution, the Liberals lagged in opinion polls, with the PCs ahead at times by over 20 percentage points. While Clark would probably have thought this an advantage, it also made the leadership a much more lucrative prize than it would have been.

== Candidates ==
Joe Clark, 44, Member of Parliament (MP) for Yellowhead, Alberta, had been the party leader since 1976 and served as prime minister from 1979 to 1980. He was supported by the more centrist elements of the party, Quebec nationalists, some Red Tories, and most of the party's Toronto-based establishment. Clark at this point was fluently bilingual and making inroads into Quebec, where support for the Tories was traditionally the weakest. Clark's efforts to broaden the party's ideological reach were generally seen as making him weaker in traditional conservative bedrocks such as Western Canada and rural Ontario.

Brian Mulroney, 44, was a Quebec lawyer and businessman who had finished third (behind Clark and Claude Wagner) at the 1976 leadership convention. He was the early front-runner to replace Clark. As former head of the Iron Ore Company of Canada, Mulroney attracted much of the party's pro-business faction in Toronto and Montreal. Mulroney was generally seen as personable and capable, though his previous attempt at the leadership had cast him as superficial. Mulroney's main pitch was that as a fluently bilingual native Quebecer, he would enable the party to break the Liberal Party's stranglehold on Quebec's seats in the House of Commons.

John Crosbie, 52, MP for St. John's West, Newfoundland, had been Clark's Minister of Finance in 1979, and known as an accomplished debater with a sense of humour. He was generally seen as the most personable candidate. He attempted to distinguish himself by adopting what he called a "continentalist" platform, with the centrepiece being free trade with the United States. His campaign was chiefly hobbled by his inability to speak French, and by a political base that was concentrated in the small province of Newfoundland. Before entering federal politics, Crosbie had been a senior provincial cabinet minister in Newfoundland.

Michael Wilson, 46, MP for Etobicoke Centre, Ontario, was a well-respected Bay Street banker and had been Minister of State for International Trade in Clark's government. He attracted modest support within his home province of Ontario, inherited the bulk of the support in Quebec for Peter Blaikie's abortive campaign, and gained only a smattering of support from other provinces. While Tories respected his financial acumen, he was an uninspiring speaker who struggled in French.

David Crombie, 47, MP for Rosedale since 1978, had been a popular Mayor of Toronto prior to entering federal politics and served as Minister of Health and Welfare in Clark's cabinet. Crombie attracted moderates who opposed Clark's leadership. Crombie was the only candidate to openly identify himself as a "Red Tory".

Peter Pocklington, 41, was an Alberta entrepreneur best known for owning the Edmonton Oilers hockey team. He ran a campaign based on strict adherence to the principles of free enterprise, with most of his focus on a flat tax. He gained some support through the Amway retail system.

John Gamble, 49, was the MP for York North, Ontario. He attracted a small band of supporters with a hard-line right-wing anti-Communist platform. Gamble had been an outspoken critic of Clark, and had hoped to parlay his role in Clark's downfall into a strong showing at the convention and a role in a future Progressive Conservative cabinet.

Neil Fraser, 49, was a civil servant who had been fired for publicly opposing the conversion to the Metric system in Canada. He mounted a campaign that had few followers.

== The campaign ==
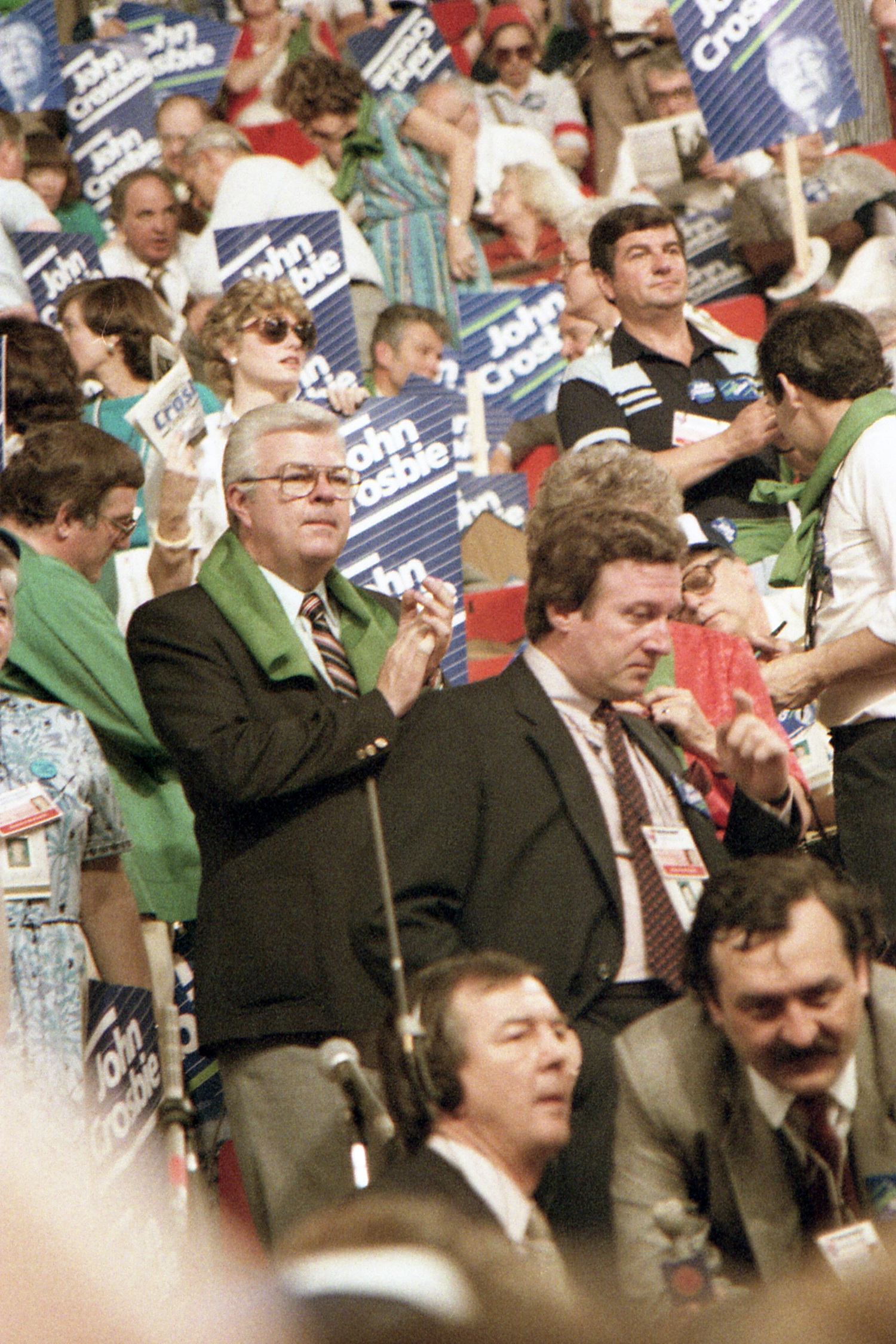
John Crosbie on the floor of the Progressive Conservative leadership convention, 1983.

As with prior conventions, the leadership would be chosen by a delegated convention. Each of the party's constituency associations was permitted to elect six delegates to the convention: two "youth" delegates and four regular delegates, one of which had to be female. Student associations were able to send three youth delegates each to the convention. PC members of federal and provincial parliaments were ex officio delegates, and provincial party associations were able to elect "at-large" delegates. Associations controlled their own nomination procedures, so delegate selection meetings were held sporadically throughout the country, concluding by the end of April. To win, a candidate would have to win 50% + 1 of valid delegate votes; In the event a majority was not reached, the candidate finishing last would be automatically eliminated and new ballots would be held until a majority resulted.

While campaigns focused on electing slates of sympathetic delegates, delegates were not bound to vote for any particular candidate once elected, and around 60% were "undecided" in the race after the elections had taken place. This meant that the primary focus of campaigning after April was to appeal to delegates and influence their preferences in later rounds.

Clark already had a sizable campaign team up and running by the time he called the leadership convention, as he had mobilized support to help gain delegates for the biennial convention. Mulroney and Crosbie had been laying the groundwork for a campaign for some time, with Crosbie expecting Clark to lose or resign soon, and Mulroney supportive of the anti-Clark movement.

=== Quebec ===
Quebec riding associations, which had tended to be inactive between elections, were overrun with Clark and Mulroney organizers in short order and many held votes within the first week of the campaign with set delegate slates. Clark's supporters tended to be former Union Nationale, Créditiste, and nationalist voters, while Mulroney's support came primarily from disaffected Liberals. These contests were especially fierce: voters only had to be PC members for five days before the vote was held, leading to many "five day wonders" that simply paid the $3 membership fee, with party operators receiving $10 commissions per voter. The lack of an age limit meant that children as young as 9 were recruited by the Clark and Mulroney camps to vote, with one 15-year-old recruiting 20 of her classmates. Most infamously, a CBC TV report showed a bus full of obviously intoxicated men from a homeless shelter travelling to vote for Mulroney in Montreal.

The Clark and Mulroney camps roughly split the province's delegates, which was seen as a strategic victory for the Clark side after Mulroney's boast that Clark "won't have enough support in Quebec to get a bridge game."

=== Davis and Lougheed ===
In the campaign's early months, there was speculation that Ontario Premier Bill Davis and Alberta Premier Peter Lougheed could enter the race. Both premiers commanded great respect in the party and contemporary polls stated they would have been amongst the frontrunners had they chosen to run. They had also been at opposite ends of the debates in the early 1980s about patriation of the Canadian constitution and about the National Energy Program. The energy issue created an open feud between them during Clark's 1979-80 PC government and had significantly undermined his attempts of offering more conciliatory federal-provincial relations as a selling point of the party.

Clark attempted to divine Davis's intentions by making a series of public remarks, including that Davis was "regional candidate" and that he had encouraged bilingual educational reforms as an election measure. The remarks angered Davis and his "Big Blue Machine" campaign team, which began to create a national structure and solicit positive responses throughout the party hierarchy, including most PC Premiers. The day before announcing his candidacy, Premier of Saskatchewan Grant Devine called Davis, downplayed his prior support, and informed him that Lougheed would campaign explicitly against him if he ran and that he could not support his candidacy. Devine's reversal had been preceded by other warnings regarding Lougheed's intentions and Davis felt that, while he could win, to do so against Lougheed and Clark would fatally divide the party on regional lines.

Davis's decision left Crombie and Wilson some hope in Ontario for recruiting members of Davis's campaign team, however, it effectively dispersed to all the candidates.

Aside from discouraging Davis's candidacy, Lougheed declined to enter the race, but insisted on inviting leadership candidates for interviews with the Alberta PC Caucus to help determine their support, as all PC MLAs were ex officio delegates. The caucus meeting was referred to by candidates as an "inquisition" and seen as using provincial government resources for an internal party election at the federal level, though only Wilson refused to attend. Lougheed ultimately did not disclose who he voted for.

=== Ideological change ===
Media coverage emphasized the pro-business and neo-liberal rhetoric of most of the candidates as a "changing of the guard" within the PC Party from their more classical conservative and moderate elements. This allowed the Clark campaign to try to cast the race as being between a group of right-wingers, on one hand, and a centrist who had been able to defeat the Liberals and had brought a multitude of previously excluded groups into the party. The Mulroney campaign responded by continuing its pro-business line, but attacking Crosbie's proposal for a free trade agreement and championing their candidate's bilingualism to find a middle ground between delegates. Crosbie's free trade proposal found a surprisingly large following with the traditionally protectionist Progressive Conservatives, even among delegates who didn't support him.

There was a renewed discussion in the party about Quebec. Even after the initial delegate contests, Clark continued to win over general Quebec public and intellectual opinion for his positions on constitutional reform and decentralization. The centrepiece was Clark's position that provinces opting out of constitutional amendments that affected provincial jurisdiction should receive funding for an equivalent program at the provincial level, an accommodation that Quebec premier René Lévesque had championed but had been excluded from the constitutional settlement. Mulroney opposed this, prompting Lévesque to attack Mulroney as a "mini-Trudeau." Mulroney suggested Clark was playing "footsie" with the sovereignist Parti Québécois, and at the April 30 all-candidates debate at Massey Hall in Toronto, Clark was booed repeatedly for answering some questions, including one from Gamble, in French.

=== John Crosbie ===
John Crosbie was seen as the dark horse of the race, with some of his delegates wearing buttons that had Clark and Mulroney as fighting hares, featuring Crosbie as a tortoise sneaking by. Crosbie's personal popularity within the party attracted many talented advisors, and among the more creative moves was exploiting a loophole in the rules that "student associations" could have delegates by creating over 20 new student associations at Canadian universities and colleges. 18 associations were accepted; among those rejected was a Newfoundland Flight school.

Crosbie's campaign hit a major snag, however, when he snapped at a news reporter in Longueuil for raising his unilingualism, saying that he would still be able to understand Quebec issues, as his lack of French was similar to not speaking German or another language. While the incident could not harm Crosbie with Quebec delegates, which were already largely split between committed Clark and Mulroney slates, the outburst was seen as showing delegates who were undecided or supporting minor candidates that Crosbie's unilingualism would be an issue in the federal election and could harm the party's chances of winning.

=== Other campaigns ===
Pocklington's campaign gained ample media attention due to his high-spending lifestyle, ideological fervour, and a foiled kidnapping plot involving his wife. It was hampered by the fact that his professional hockey team, the Edmonton Oilers, were in the Stanley Cup playoffs and he insisted on taking trips to Long Island, which angered potential supporters. He was embarrassingly confronted by the Mayor of Belleville, Ontario on the convention floor for missing a scheduled meeting, and during a breakfast meeting asked Premier of Prince Edward Island Jim Lee what his job was.

Controversy erupted on May 23 when then-CBC reporter Mike Duffy reported in the beginning of May that agents of the campaigns of Mulroney and four other candidates had met to make an "ABC" (Anybody But Clark) strategy for the convention. While Mulroney denied the meeting repeatedly, threatening to sue Duffy for libel at one point, the other candidates' campaigns admitted to the meeting.

== The convention ==
Due to the leak of the "ABC" meeting, it was believed that Clark would have to score very close to 50% on the first ballot in order to regain the leadership. Clark's strategy relied on a large first ballot total, featuring a good part of the Quebec delegates, that would bring delegates from the left-leaning Crombie and Clark-loyalist Wilson to his side. During Clark's speech, around half of the party's Senate and House caucus members stood on stage with him.

Mulroney's strategy remained mobilizing anti-Clark sentiment, which was spread fairly evenly around the other candidates, toward himself. However, over enthusiastic aides had leaked plans and negotiations with the Wilson and Crombie campaigns, and an impromptu invasion of the latter's campaign headquarters had alienated Crombie from his campaign.

Crosbie hoped to use his status as the least polarizing personality to attract delegates from either Mulroney or Clark if there had been a disappointing finish by either, and to attract support from minor candidates. His was generally considered the best convention speech, and it featured a section in French and a promise to become fluent in the language within two years if he won.

Wilson's campaign relied on an appeal to moderate Ontario delegates, who had desired a Davis candidacy, as a safe alternative to the more polarizing personalities.

Despite ideological differences, Pocklington, Crombie, and Wilson were all on good terms throughout the campaign, with some speculation that if either of their delegate numbers were respectable, the three candidates could mount a movement together, influencing the outcome. Pocklington, whose delegates were generally viewed as the most loyal to their candidate, predicated his support for the more ideologically similar Crosbie, Mulroney, or another candidate entirely on the likelihood of Clark's defeat after the first ballot.

While Gamble's campaign had gotten off to a relatively decent start, largely in part due to his being one of the earliest to begin campaigning in earnest and the initial lack of a clear alternative from the right of the party, he would ultimately lose most of his support to Pocklington, whose campaign was better funded and organised. By the time of the convention only Mulroney's campaign considered Gamble worthy of much attention, and they discreetly encouraged him to deliver a blistering anti-Clark speech in his nomination address, believing that Gamble would not make it past the first ballot and hoping he would agree to endorse Mulroney and deliver the few delegates he could muster.

Granted the same nationally televised 25 minutes as the other candidates for his convention address, Fraser engaged in a bizarre speech that likened Confederation to a blood transfusion to Quebec. Lise Bissonnette commented that if the speech had been heard on Radio-Canada, it would have set the Tories' Quebec efforts back 10 years.

=== First Ballot ===
First ballot

Clark	1,091	36.5%
Mulroney	874	29.2%
Crosbie	639	21.4%
Wilson	144	4.8%
Crombie	116	3.9%
Pocklington	102	3.4%
Gamble	17	0.6%
Fraser	5	0.2%
Total votes cast	2988

Gamble and Fraser's presence on the first ballot allowed the more popular candidates the opportunity to assess their delegate numbers and plan without fear of being automatically eliminated. Fraser earned the votes of just five delegates and was eliminated first. Gamble had indicated his willingness to drop out prior to the first ballot and endorse another candidate, but none was willing to meet his demand of a cabinet seat in a prospective Tory government, and the 17 delegates he earned gave him no real bargaining power after the fact. He thus dropped out and, despite the hopes of Mulroney's campaign to gain his delegates, endorsed Crosbie, who also earned Fraser's endorsement.

Clark's first ballot showing was considered strong, and seemed to forestall the possibility of his delegates dispersing in great numbers to other camps, which the Crombie and Crosbie campaigns had pinned their hopes on.

Pocklington had a disappointing first ballot: the only advisor close to predicting his number had been pollster Michael Adams, who had jokingly guessed "99", a reference to the jersey number of Oilers' star Wayne Gretzky. The strength of Clark's showing influenced Pocklington to immediately move to Mulroney's camp on the floor and endorse him.

Wilson's numbers were far below expectations: loyalists had expected more than 300 delegates. The disappointing result made his delegates the main target of the other campaigns. Wilson, visibly shaken by the result, withdrew and endorsed Mulroney after prodding from Pocklington. Crombie remained on the ballot.

=== Second Ballot ===
Second ballot

Clark	1,085	36.7%
Mulroney	1,021	34.6%
Crosbie	781	26.4%
Crombie	67	2.3%
Total votes cast	2954

Clark's vote numbers stalled the second ballot, and Mulroney pulled closer, gaining about half of the support of Pocklington and Wilson delegates; Crosbie gained 140 delegates despite only being endorsed by Fraser and Gamble.

Crombie was eliminated. While ideologically in tune with Clark, Crombie and many of his advisors felt cast aside during Clark's leadership, and he endorsed Crosbie, to the great disappointment of the Clark campaign.

Clark's inability to gain any support from the delegates of the defeated candidates was generally seen as the death knell of his candidacy and leadership. Crosbie's campaign, knowing that most of the support they required would have to come from Clark delegates, pleaded with Clark to drop out, stating that their delegates preferred Mulroney to Clark 2:1 and that this was the only way to stop Mulroney. During the live television broadcast, Newfoundland Premier Brian Peckford was shown attempting to persuade Clark to drop out and endorse Crosbie to head off a Mulroney victory. Clark and his advisors, however, viewed that such a move would be viewed as personally humiliating and damaging to his previous attempts to recruit Quebec voters to the party. Additionally, Clark was determined to see the party return to power at the next federal election even if he was not personally leading it, and despite his personal distaste at the prospect of Mulroney becoming prime minister, Clark did not believe that Crosbie was capable of steering the party to victory in a federal election.

=== Third and Fourth Ballots ===
Third ballot

Clark	1,058	35.8%
Mulroney	1,036	35.1%
Crosbie	858	29.1%
Total votes cast	2952

Crosbie finished last on the third ballot and, while he preferred Mulroney, he declined to endorse a candidate out of deference to Clark, who had appointed him Finance Minister four years before. When Clark advisor Finlay MacDonald spoke to Crosbie and his campaign team and began with "For the sake of the party," Jean Pigott, a noted moderate, bluntly told him that she couldn't support Clark after what he had put the party through, silencing the room and prompting MacDonald's exit.

The conventional wisdom was that his delegates would break at least 2:1 in favour of Mulroney over Clark. The conventional wisdom played out, and Mulroney was elected on the fourth ballot and declared the winner.

Fourth ballot

Mulroney	1,584	54.5%
Clark	1,325	45.6%
Total votes cast	2909

A poll of delegates on the final ballot showed that Mulroney had won a bare majority of Clark's home province of Alberta, and that Clark had won a bare majority in Mulroney's home province of Quebec. Mulroney's strong showing amongst Ontario delegates (65% to 34%) seemed to account for most of his margin of victory.

Political commentators have said that of the other possible two-man ballots among the frontrunners, Clark would probably have had the advantage over Crosbie (because Crosbie could not speak French), while Crosbie could possibly have defeated Mulroney (due to the general "Anyone but Mulroney" sentiment of the Clark delegates).

Delegate support by ballot
Candidate	1st ballot		2nd ballot		3rd ballot		4th ballot	
Candidate	Votes cast	%	Votes cast	%	Votes cast	%	Votes cast	%
Joe Clark	1,091	36.5%	1,085	36.7%	1,058	35.8%	1,325	45.6%
Brian Mulroney	874	29.2%	1,021	34.6%	1,036	35.1%	1,584	54.4%
John Crosbie	639	21.4%	781	26.4%	858	29.1%	Did not endorse	
Michael Wilson	144	4.8%	Endorsed Mulroney					
David Crombie	116	3.9%	67	2.3%	Endorsed Crosbie			
Peter Pocklington	102	3.4%	Endorsed Mulroney					
John A. Gamble	17	0.6%	Endorsed Crosbie					
Neil Fraser	5	0.2%	Endorsed Crosbie					
Total	2,988	100.0%	2,954	100.0%	2,952	100.0%	2,909	100.0%

First round
Clark	36.51%
Mulroney	29.25%
Crosbie	21.39%
Wilson	4.82%
Crombie	3.88%
Pocklington	3.41%
Gamble	0.57%
Fraser	0.17%

Second round
Clark	36.73%
Mulroney	34.56%
Crosbie	26.44%
Crombie	2.27%

Third round
Clark	35.84%
Mulroney	35.09%
Crosbie	29.07%

Fourth round
Mulroney	54.45%
Clark	45.55%

- Percentages are rounded, so they may not equal 100%.

== Aftermath ==
The two party conventions in 1983 were a divisive experience for the PC Party as they set those loyal to the party's leader against those who believed that change was necessary for the party to win, a struggle the party had been infamous for since the era of John Diefenbaker in the 1960s. The general consensus was that Mulroney had become the choice of delegates due to his perceived ability to return the party to government, rather than the ideological or personal attachments that Clark and Crosbie's candidacies inspired.

Mulroney won a massive victory in the 1984 election. To the surprise of many in the media, the party's caucus remained united throughout Mulroney's tenure, even after dismal poll numbers, constitutional talks, and the formation of the Reform Party and the Bloc Québécois in the late 1980s and early 1990s. Crosbie, Clark, Wilson, and Crombie gained prominent cabinet positions in Mulroney's government, which adopted Crosbie's continentalist platform (resulting in the Canada-U.S. Free Trade Agreement) and many of Clark's overtures to Quebec, parts of which were included in the Meech Lake Accord. Pocklington also briefly acted as an economic advisor to Mulroney's government, though soon withdrew from politics in order to focus on his business interests. In sharp contrast, Gamble lost his seat at the election, and was later expelled from the party in 1988 after running as an independent against the official PC candidate in Markham. The convention would mark Fraser's only involvement in federal politics, as he returned to focusing on his legal case against the federal government, ultimately retiring to private life after the Supreme Court of Canada dismissed the case in late 1985.

Clark won the leadership of the party again in 1998, and retired as leader in 2002 and as an MP in 2004.

== Works consulted ==
- Martin, Patrick (1983). Contenders: The Tory Quest for Power. Toronto: Prentice Hall. ISBN 978-0131713499.
- Laschinger, John (1992). Leaders & Lesser Mortals: Backroom Politics in Canada. Toronto: Key Porter Books. ISBN 1550134442.

== See also ==
- Progressive Conservative leadership conventions
- Photographs from the floor of the 1983 convention
