= Metrication in Canada =

Adoption of the metric system in Canada

The metrication logo used in Canada during the 1970s and 1980s

Metrication in Canada is the conversion of Canada from imperial units to the metric system. A federal program, coordinated by the Metric Commission, began in 1970 and during the following decade converted weather reporting, road signs, fuel sales and product labelling to metric units. The Commission was abolished in 1985, ending active government promotion of metrication.

All units of measurement in Canada are defined on the basis of the SI, and prepackaged goods sold to consumers must declare their quantity in metric units. Imperial units nevertheless remain legally defined under the Weights and Measures Act and may be used alongside metric units.

In everyday life Canadians use a mix of both systems. Temperature, fuel, speed limits and road distances are metric, while personal height and weight, cooking, construction materials, and the advertised prices of meat and produce often remain imperial. The continued use of imperial units reflects historical ties with the United Kingdom, supply chains shared with the United States, and opposition to metrication during the transition period. Surveys have found that most Canadians accept this mixture and few want to return to imperial units, although older Canadians are more likely to favour imperial.

== Before metrication ==
Until the 1970s, Canada used the imperial measurement system, set out as "Canadian units of measurement" in Schedule II of the Weights and Measures Act. These units have the same names and values as United States customary units, except for measures of volume such as the gallon. Before metrication, gasoline was sold by the imperial gallon (about 4.55 litres), and in trade with the United States it was often unclear whether a figure in gallons referred to the US gallon (3.79 litres) or the imperial gallon.

== Metrication program (1970–1985) ==
=== The Metric Commission ===
The Liberal government of Pierre Trudeau began implementing metrication in 1970. The Metric Commission was established in 1971, after industry had called for Canada to drop imperial measures, to plan and coordinate the change. It was headed by Stevenson Gossage. Weather reporting was deliberately converted first, a strategy later credited with helping the public adjust.

=== Changeover ===
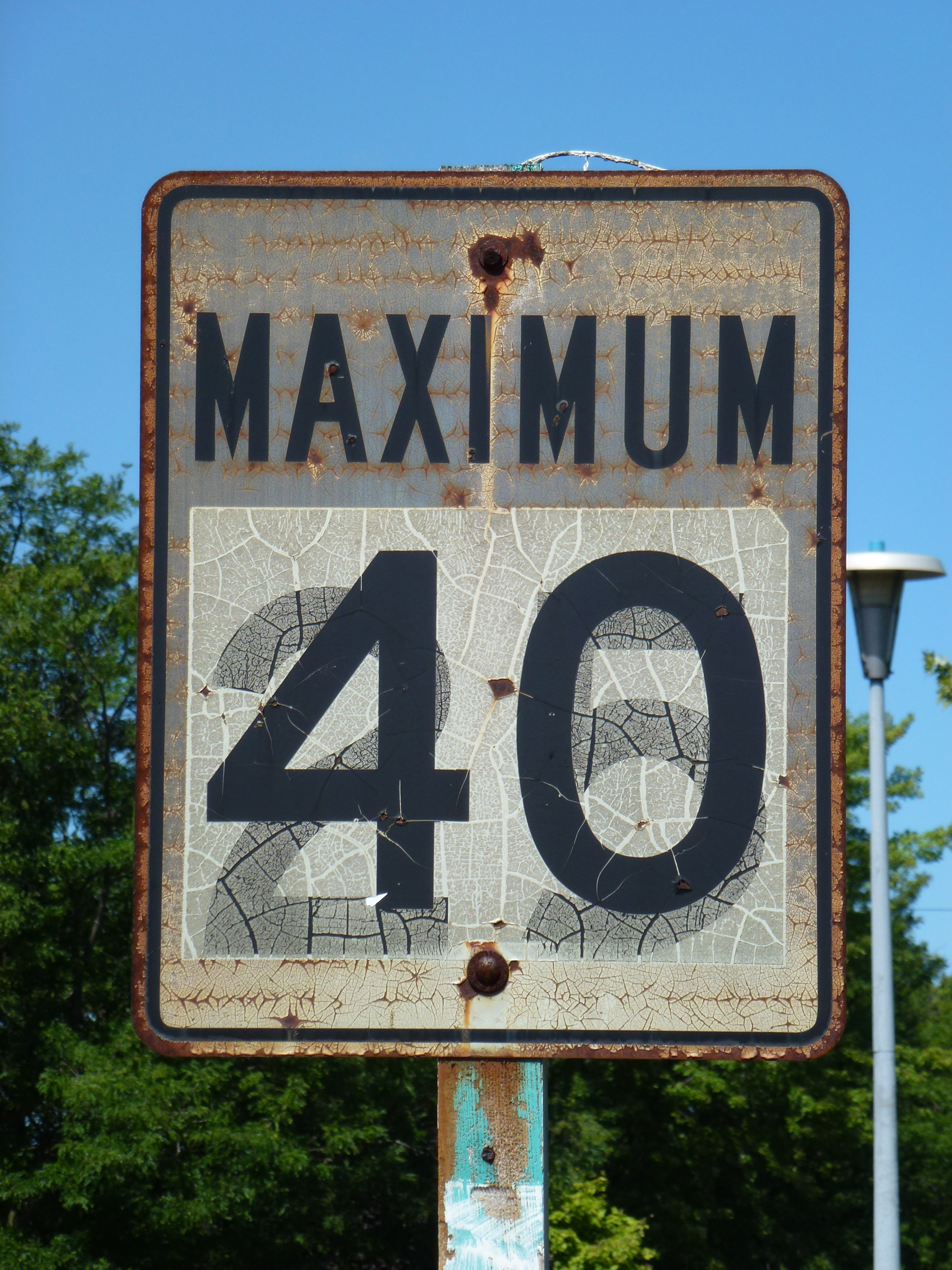
A speed limit sign in Bolton, Ontario, metricated long ago, with the old "25 mph" value showing through the 40 km/h limit

Conversion proceeded sector by sector:

- April 1975: Celsius replaced Fahrenheit for weather temperatures.
- September 1975: rainfall began to be measured in millimetres and snow in centimetres.
- 1976: prepackaged food products were required to declare their mass or volume in metric units.
- April 1976: wind speed, visibility and barometric pressure were reported in metric units, with pressure given in kilopascals rather than the hectopascals (millibars) used in most other countries.
- September 1977: over the Labour Day weekend, every speed limit sign in the country was changed from miles per hour to kilometres per hour, under a 1972 agreement among the provinces. New cars were required to have speedometers showing km/h and odometers in kilometres, and distances on road signs were converted over the following months.
- 1979: gasoline pumps changed from imperial gallons to litres.
- 1980: milk was fully metricated.

=== Opposition ===
Metrication met resistance. More than three dozen Progressive Conservative Members of Parliament championed petitions against it carrying thousands of signatures, and after the metrication of gasoline and diesel sales, 37 of them opened a "freedom to measure" gas station in Carleton Place, Ontario, selling fuel in both imperial gallons and litres. Peterborough, Ontario, one of the government's three test centres for the program, became a centre of opposition, and its Member of Parliament, Bill Domm, was one of the country's most outspoken opponents of metrication; he said people were ready to go to jail over the issue.

A few government employees lost their jobs over their opposition. Neil Fraser, a Revenue Canada official who publicly opposed mandatory conversion, was dismissed for "conduct unacceptable for a public servant".

Training in metric conversion was not universal. On July 23, 1983, Air Canada Flight 143, known as the Gimli Glider, ran out of fuel in flight after the fuel load was calculated in pounds rather than kilograms, a mistake to which poor metrication training contributed.

=== End of the program ===
After the election of Brian Mulroney's Progressive Conservative government in 1984, the Metric Commission was abolished on March 31, 1985. This ended active promotion of metrication. A ruling at the start of 1985 gave store owners the choice of selling in metric or imperial units, and many retailers returned to pricing by the pound, partly because a price per pound looks lower than the same price per kilogram.

== After 1985 ==
The Weights and Measures Act remained in force after the Commission's abolition. It provides that all units of measurement used in Canada are determined on the basis of the SI, and permits trade in any unit set out in its schedules: the SI units and customary units used with them, such as the litre and hectare, and the imperial "Canadian units". Old French units may still be used to describe land in Quebec originally granted under seigneurial tenure. The Act is administered by Measurement Canada, the federal agency responsible for legal metrology.

In 2005 the Ontario Ministry of Education changed the secondary school mathematics curriculum to allow imperial units to be taught alongside metric units, a departure from earlier efforts to teach metric only. The change reflected the reluctance of much of the private sector to metricate, which had left students unprepared for the units used in the workplace. Many other provinces and territories also include imperial units in their curricula.

== Current status of metrication in Canada ==
Canada is officially metric, and metric units are standard in law, weather reporting, road transport and product labelling. Imperial units remain common for personal measurements, cooking and construction, and for historical reasons in land surveys and railways. Many everyday activities use both systems.

Units in common use in Canada (summary of the sections below)
Mainly metric	Mixed	Mainly imperial
Road signs, speed limits and fuel sales Weather reports Labelling of prepackaged goods Hospital records and lab results	Pricing of meat and produce Cooking and recipes Package sizes (imperial sizes labelled in metric)	Personal height and weight Building materials and home sizes Mainline railways Prairie land surveys, grain and cattle Paper sizes

=== Transport ===
==== Road ====
Canadians buy gasoline in litres, observe speed limits in km/h and read distances in kilometres on road signs and maps. Speedometers and odometers are metric, although most speedometers also show smaller figures in miles per hour. Natural Resources Canada publishes fuel efficiency for new vehicles in litres per 100 kilometres and in miles per imperial gallon, and dealer window stickers often include miles-per-gallon figures.

==== Rail ====
Mainline railways, including Canadian National, Canadian Pacific Kansas City and commuter rail services, measure trackage in miles and set speed limits in miles per hour, while subways and light rail systems use metric units. Railways describe train length and height in feet and train mass in short tons, and railcars show weights in both systems.

==== Air ====
Luggage limits at Canadian airports are given in metric units with imperial conversions. As in the United States, runway lengths are given in feet and speeds in knots, and, as in many metric countries, altitude is given in feet. Aviation fuel is measured in metric units.

=== Shopping and packaging ===
==== Labelling and pricing ====
Net quantity declarations on prepackaged products sold to consumers must be stated in metric units. The mandatory Nutrition Facts table uses metric units for basic nutrients, although serving sizes can be described in any unit, such as a can or a cup.

Meat and produce are commonly advertised per pound, but are sold at the checkout by the kilogram or per 100 grams. The price of a steak, for example, is typically advertised per pound while the package is priced per kilogram. Fruit and vegetables are usually advertised by the pound, with the price per kilogram shown in smaller type. More expensive items such as deli meats and fish are often priced per 100 grams. Research at Concordia University found that shoppers perceive food as cheaper when the price per pound is emphasized, even though the receipt is always in kilograms.

==== Package sizes ====
Many products are made in imperial sizes but labelled in metric units, a practice known as "soft metric". Butter, for example, is sold in 454-gram packages, equivalent to one pound; under "hard metric" sizing it would come in 500 g packages. After a manufacturer lost market share when it switched aluminum foil from 25-foot to 10-metre rolls, it returned to soft metric, labelling the roll "25 feet" with the metric equivalent in small print. Fast food chains based in the United States often use US customary sizes converted to metric, so a 20 US fluid ounce soft drink bottle is labelled 591 mL, or occasionally rounded to 600 mL.

Beer in bottles is 12 imperial fluid ounces (labelled 341 mL), but beer in cans is 12 US fluid ounces (labelled 355 mL). A larger bottle is labelled 1.18 L (42 imperial fluid ounces; 40 US fluid ounces). The traditional Canadian soft drink can held 10 imperial fluid ounces (284 mL), later marketed as 280 mL, and was displaced by the US-derived 355 mL size only in the early 1990s.

A 750-millilitre bottle of spirits is known in Canada as a "two-six" or "twenty-sixer", a name that survived metrication from the pre-metric 26-ounce bottle.

=== Home and personal life ===
==== Weather and cooking ====
Celsius is almost universal for weather, and outdoor signs usually display Celsius. Outdoor window thermometers often show both scales, and thermostats may display either. Environment Canada offers an imperial option alongside its metric forecasts.

Cooking uses both systems. Fahrenheit is still common for oven temperatures, because many kitchen appliances are imported from the United States, and recipes mix grams, millilitres, cups, ounces and tablespoons.

==== Height, weight and health ====
Canadians commonly use imperial units for personal height and weight. Newborns are weighed in kilograms in hospital, but birth weight and length are usually announced in pounds, ounces and inches. Driver's licences give height in centimetres, but many people describe themselves in feet, inches and pounds.

Metric units generally take precedence in health care, although some differ from those used in the United States: blood cholesterol, for example, is measured in millimoles per litre in Canada but in milligrams per decilitre in the United States. Most hospitals officially record height and weight in metric units, but many physicians chart them in imperial units, and most growth charts show both. Dietitians use kilocalories and blood pressure is measured in millimetres of mercury, both metric units that are not part of the SI.

==== Paper and sport ====
Canada uses inch-based paper sizes such as letter (8.5 × 11 inches) and legal, rather than the A4 size used in most of the world. The federal government uses a combination of ISO sizes and the CAN 2-9.60M standard, whose P1 to P6 sizes are US paper sizes rounded to the nearest 5 mm. Stationery and photographic prints are sold in inch sizes.

Canadian football is played on a field measured in yards, 110 yards (100.6 metres) between the goal lines and 65 yards wide.

=== Construction and real estate ===
Canada's construction and real estate industries still rely mainly on imperial measurements. Plywood comes in 4-by-8-foot sheets, lumber is sold as 2-by-4s and 4-by-4s by the linear foot, and carpet is priced by the square foot. Construction materials, including lumber, drywall and plywood, are sold in imperial sizes, and fitting metric wallboard designed for 400 mm centres to old 16 in (406 mm) stud spacing is difficult. Building codes and zoning by-laws are metric, though most codes include imperial equivalents. Most commercial and all government building plans are drawn in metric, while residential plans tend to be imperial except in Quebec, where they are metric. Homes in English-speaking Canada are mostly built and advertised in imperial units, while in Quebec they are built in metric and advertised in both.

=== Agriculture and land ===
Oats, wheat and other grains are sold by the imperial bushel (36.369 litres). In trade with the United States, which uses the smaller Winchester bushel (35.239 litres), care is needed over bushel weights. Cattle prices are quoted in dollars per hundredweight (100 lb).

Land surveys predate metrication. In the Canadian Prairies, the Dominion Land Survey divided land into a grid based on the square mile, so rural roads follow a one-mile grid, distances are still commonly given in miles, and landholdings are measured in acres. Much of southern Ontario was instead surveyed on a grid of 1.25 miles (100 chains), which corresponds almost exactly to 2 kilometres.

== Assessment of the Canadian metrication program ==
Public acceptance remained limited a decade into the program. A 1983 poll found that only 28 per cent of Canadians said they found converting from imperial units "not at all difficult", the same proportion that had said in 1973 that they expected the change to be that easy.

When the Progressive Conservatives took office in 1984, many of their members had opposed metric since its introduction, and the new government was expected to slow the program. Teachers and business people nevertheless warned that any move back to imperial units would be expensive and confusing. The Metric Commission was abolished the following year, but the conversions already made were not reversed.

According to his son, Gossage considered the change important for Canada and saw the imperial system as an "unnecessary bottleneck" in international trade. Interviewed in 2025, the son said the transition had worked out well, as younger generations had been raised with metric as their primary system.

== Public attitudes to metric and imperial units ==
Surveys since the 2010s have found that Canadians accept the current mixed system and do not want to return to imperial units, while continuing to use imperial units for particular purposes. Which units people use depends strongly on context and age.

A 2017 Angus Reid Institute poll found that 91 per cent of Canadians gave their height and weight in imperial units, while 87 per cent used Celsius for air temperature and 66 per cent gave distances between cities in kilometres. Two-thirds (67 per cent) were content with the existing mix of measurements; 16 per cent wanted to return to imperial and 17 per cent wanted the country to work harder to adopt metric fully. More respondents said they knew the metric system well (86 per cent) than the imperial system (74 per cent), and Canadians under 35 were more likely to use metric than those over 55.

A 2022 Research Co. poll found that 56 per cent of Canadians wanted to keep the metric system and 29 per cent would prefer to adopt imperial. Support for imperial was highest among those aged 55 and over (38 per cent), against 23 per cent of those aged 35 to 54 and 24 per cent of those aged 18 to 34. Most respondents used imperial units for height, weight and oven temperature, but metric units for liquid volume, outdoor temperature and vehicle speed (82 per cent used kilometres per hour).

Units Canadians reported using, 2022
Measurement	Metric	Imperial
A person's height	20%	80%
A person's weight	24%	76%
Oven temperature	41%	59%
Outdoor temperature	77%	23%
Volume of liquid in a container	84%	16%

Quebec has gone further than other provinces in some areas: residential buildings there are designed in metric, whereas elsewhere residential plans are usually imperial.

== See also ==
- Chronology and status of metrication by country
- Metrication opposition
- Metrication in Australia
- Metrication in the United Kingdom
- Metrication in the United States
- Metrication Ordinance (Hong Kong)
- Myanmar units of measurement
- Weights and Measures Acts (UK)
