= Arpent =

Unit of length or unit of area

Arpent (Parisian)
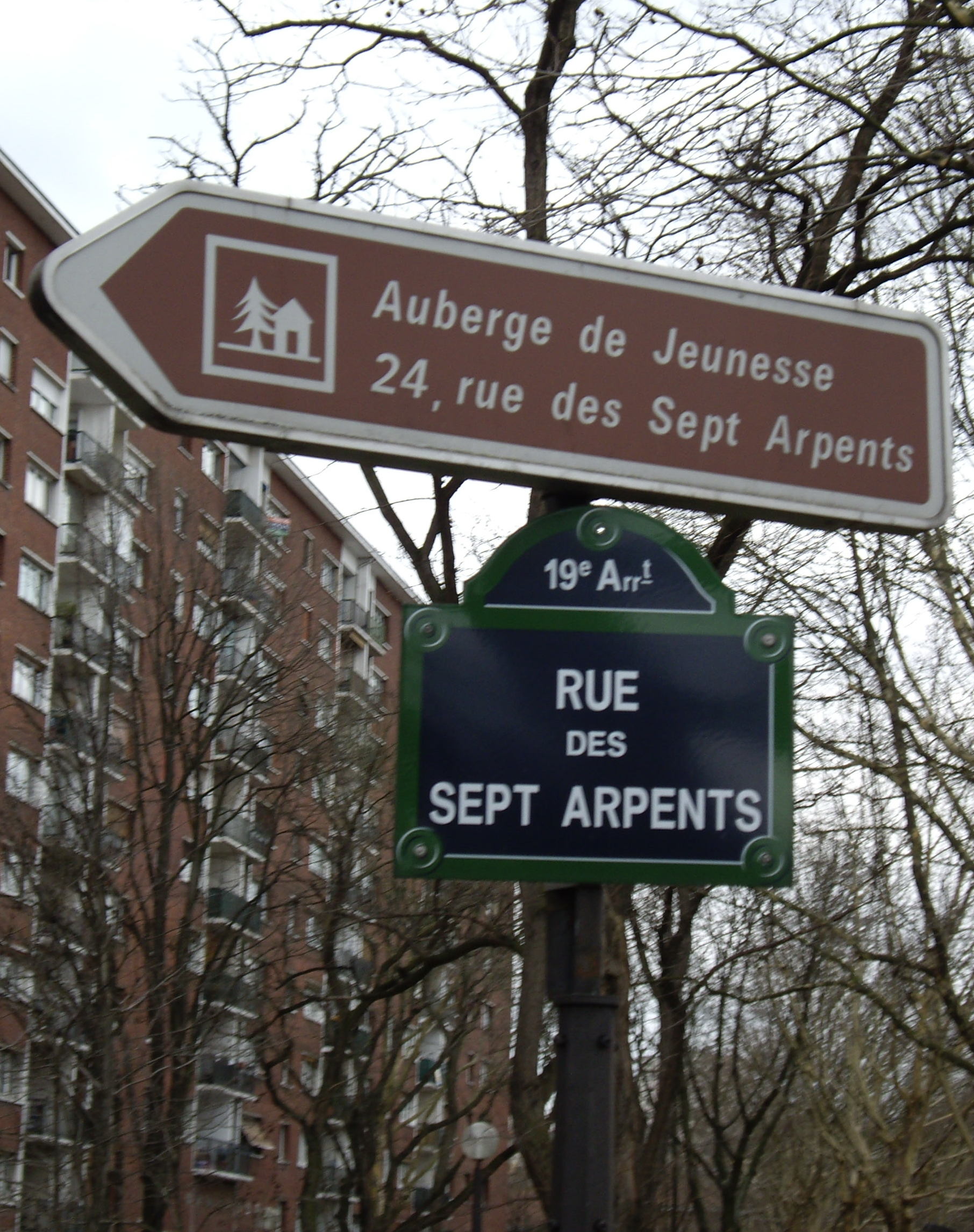
- "Seven-Arpent Street" [500 metres, or 1/3 mile] in Paris; many streets and roads are named for their length in arpents.

General information
- Unit system: French
- Unit of: length

Conversions
1 arpent (parisian) in ...	... is equal to ...
- SI units: 71.46466 m
- imperial/US units: 78.15470 yd or 234.4641 ft

Arpent (North American)
- Unit system: French
- Unit of: length

Conversions
1 arpent (north american) in ...	... is equal to ...
- SI units: 58.47131 m
- imperial/US units: 63.94500 yd or 191.8350 ft

An arpent (French pronunciation: [aʁpɑ̃], sometimes called arpen) is either of two units of measure, a unit of length or a unit of area. It is a pre-metric French unit based on the Roman actus. It is used in Quebec, some areas of the United States that were part of French Louisiana, and in Mauritius and the Seychelles.

== Etymology ==
The word arpent is believed to derive from the Late Latin arepennis (equal to half a jugerum), which in turn comes from the Gaulish *are-penno- ("end, extremity of a field").

== Unit of length ==
There were various standard arpents. The most common were the arpent used in North America, which was defined as 180 French feet (pied, of approximately 32.48 centimetres or 12.79 inches), and the arpent used in Paris, which was defined as 220 French feet.

- In North America, 1 arpent = 180 French feet = about 192 English feet = about 58.47 metres
- In Paris, 1 arpent = 220 French feet = about 234 English feet = about 71.46 metres

== Unit of area ==
Historically, in North America, 1 (square) arpent (arpent carré), also known as a French acre, was 180 French feet × 180 French feet = 32,400 French square feet = about 3419 square metres = about 0.845 English acres. Certain U.S. states have official definitions of the arpent which vary slightly:

- In Louisiana, Mississippi, Alabama, and Florida, the official conversion is 1 arpent = 0.84628 acres (3,424.8 square metres).
- In Arkansas and Missouri, the official conversion is 1 arpent = 0.8507 acres (3,443 square metres).

In Paris, the square arpent was 220 French feet × 220 French feet = 48,400 French square feet, about 5,107 square metres or 1.262 acres.

In Mauritius and Seychelles, an arpent is about 4220.87 square metres, 0.4221 hectares, 1.043 acres.

== Louisiana ==
In Louisiana, parcels of land known as arpent sections or French arpent land grants also pre-date the Public Land Survey System (PLSS), but are treated as PLSS sections. An arpent can mean a linear measurement of approximately 192 feet (59 m) or an area measurement of about 0.84 acres (3,400 m^{2}). The area measurement is also sometimes referred to as an arpent carré (square arpent) or an arpent de surface.

French arpent land divisions are long narrow parcels of land, also called ribbon farms, usually found along the navigable streams of southern Louisiana and along major waterways in other areas. This system of land subdivision was begun by French settlers in the 18th century, according to typical French practice at the time and was continued by both the Spanish and by the American government after the sale of Louisiana. A typical French arpent land division is 2 to 4 arpents wide along the river by 40 to 60 arpents deep, while the Spanish arpent land divisions tend to be 6 to 8 arpents wide by 40 arpents deep. Land grant would typically be specified in terms of arpents de face, referring to the amount of river frontage.

This method of land division provided each land-owner with river frontage as well as land suitable for cultivation and habitation. These areas are given numbers just like standard sections, although the section numbers frequently exceed the normal upper limit of 36.

== See also ==
- Acre
- Morgen
- Units of measurement in France before the French Revolution
- Voltaire famously dismissed Canada as Quelques arpents de neige, "a few acres of snow".
- Weights and Measures Act (Canada)
