= Scruple (unit) =

Mass unit in the apothecaries' system

The scruple (℈) is a small unit in the apothecaries' system, derived from the old Roman scrupulum (lit. 'small pebble') unit (scrupulus/scrupulum).

== Mass unit ==
The scruple is 8/175 of an ounce (or 1/24 of a troy ounce), 1/3 dram, or 20 grains: it is therefore exactly 1.2959782 grams.

The Roman scruple was 11.875% smaller, therefore being exactly 1.14208078875 grams.

== Volume unit ==
The fluid scruple is 1/24 fluid ounce, 1/3 fluid dram, 20 minims, 1/4 teaspoon, or 1 saltspoon.

It is therefore equal to 1.2322304 milliliters in the US customary system, or 1.1838776 milliliters in the imperial customary system (to eight significant figures).

== See also ==
- Scrupulosity
- Roman units
- Byzantine units
- E (Cyrillic)
