= Congius =

Ancient Roman unit of measurement

In Ancient Roman measurement, congius (pl. congii, from Greek konkhion, diminutive of konkhē, konkhos, "shellful") was a liquid measure that was about 3.48 litres (0.92 U.S. gallons). It was equal to the larger chous of the Ancient Greeks. The congius contained six sextarii.

Cato tells us that he was wont to give each of his slaves a congius of wine at the Saturnalia and Compitalia. Pliny relates, among other examples of hard drinking, that a Novellius Torquatus of Mediolanum obtained a cognomen (Tricongius, a nine-bottle-man) by drinking three congii (approximately 14 modern 75 cl bottles or roughly 2.7 gallons in total) of wine at once:

It is in the exercise of their drinking powers that the Parthians look for their share of fame, and it was in this that Alcibiades among the Greeks earned his great repute. Among ourselves, too, Novellius Torquatus of Mediolanum, a man who held all the honours of the state from the prefecture to the pro-consulate, could drink off three congii at a single draught, a feat from which he obtained the surname of 'Tricongius': this he did before the eyes of the Emperor Tiberius, and to his extreme surprise and astonishment, a man who in his old age was very morose, and indeed very cruel in general; though in his younger days he himself had been too much addicted to wine.

— Pliny the Elder. The Natural History. xiv.22 s28. eds. John Bostock, Henry Thomas Riley. 1855

The Roman system of weights and measures, including the congius, was introduced to Britain in the 1st century by Emperor Claudius. Following the Anglo-Saxon invasions of the 4th and 5th century, Roman units were, for the most part, replaced with North German units. Following the conversion of England to Christianity in the 7th century, Latin became the language of state. From this time on the word "congius" is simply the Latin word for gallon. Thus we find the word congius mentioned in a charter of Edmund I in 946.

In Apothecary Measures, the Latin Congius (abbreviation c.) is used for the Queen Anne gallon of 231 cubic inches, also known as the US gallon.

== Congius of Vespasian ==
William Smith in his book A dictionary of Greek and Roman antiquities says:

There is a congius in existence called the congius of Vespasian or the Farnese congius, bearing an inscription, which states that it was made in the year 75 A.D., according to the standard measure in the capitol, and that it contained, by weight, ten pounds. (Imp. Caes. vi. T. Caes. Aug. F. iiii. Cos. Mensurae exactae in Capitolio, P. x.; see also Festus, Publica Pondera.) By means of this congius the weight of the Roman pound has been ascertained. This congius holds, according to an experiment made by Dr. Hase, in 1824, 52037.692 grains of distilled water.

In 1866, an article entitled On a Congius appeared in the Journal of the British Archaeological Association casting doubt on the authenticity of the Farnese congius. A 1926 article in the journal Ancient Weights and Measures notes that "there is no true patina upon it" and that apparent red oxide is drops of shellac.

The 2002 book Aqueduct hunting in the seventeenth century: Raffaello Fabretti's De aquis et aquaeductibus veteris Romae by Harry B. Evans reports that the original congius of Farnese has been lost and that the extant copies are considered spurious.

On the other hand, according to the 1883 edition of A complete handbook to the National museum in Naples item number 74599 bears the following description:

74599. Measure for liquids,-- the congius spoken of by Pliny. A long-necked vase without handle, bearing the inscription IMP. CAESARE VESPAS. VI. T. CAES. AUG. F. IIII COS. MENSURAE EXACTAE IN CAPITOLIO P. X. -- "measure of the weight of ten pounds gauged at the Capitol in the sixth consulate of the Emperor Caesar Vespasian and the fourth of his son Titus Augustus Caesar" (Borgia.)

== See also ==
- Ancient Roman units of measurement
