= Stuart Ash =

Canadian graphic designer

Stuart Ash (born 1942 in Hamilton, Ontario) is a Canadian designer who gained international fame in the late 1960s. He is recognized for designing strategic visual identities within Gottschalk + Ash, which he founded in partnership with Fritz Gottschalk in Montreal. He is considered one of the pioneers of international graphic design in Canada.

== Biography ==
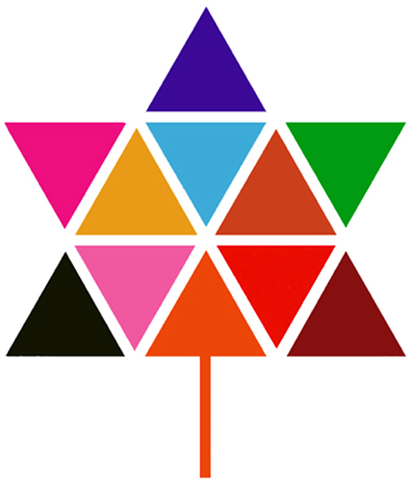
Centennial Symbol

Metric Commission logo, used on many metric products in Canada during the 1970s and 1980s

Stuart Ash began studying graphic design at the Western Technical-Commercial School between 1957 and 1962. He graduated from the Ontario College of Art and Design in 1964. Upon leaving school, he worked among others with Cooper & Beatty and Paul Arthur and Associates, among others. During the 1960s, these advertising agencies were among the most popular in Canada. They were mainly recognized for their typographic creations and their large-scale advertising campaigns. While working at Cooper & Beatty, he met Anthony Mann, Artistic Director and Typographer, with whom he worked jointly on the design of the logo of the Canadian Centennial.

By working on the centennial logo, he met Fritz Gottschalk, a designer of Swiss origin, with whom he conceived the visual identity of the Montreal Museum of Fine Arts in 1965. In 1966, Ash and Gottschalk joined together to create Gottschalk + Ash. This new agency quickly built an international reputation. He remained at the head of this agency, until his retirement in 2007. He was present, in 2012, at the signing of the contract between G + A and Entro, an environmental communication firm.

Ash's personal work has also been exhibited; among others at the Montreal Museum of Fine Arts, the National Gallery of Canada and the Mead Library of Ideas in New York.

== Gottschalk + Ash ==
In 1966 in Montreal, Ash teamed up with Swiss-born designer Fritz Gottschalk to found Gottschalk + Ash International. The philosophy of the design agency aims to provide global companies with "solutions tailored to the public's vision".

The company quickly became a staple on the international scene. The growth of the company benefits in particular from the visibility brought by the Expo 67 to the city of Montreal in the design circles. On the other hand, their overall vision of design goes beyond the graphic aspect; they offer a diversified approach by integrating strategic marketing and research concepts into their solutions. Part of their success is also due to their openness to design on a global scale, joining the best design schools in America and Europe, but also sporadically partnering with designers from diverse backgrounds. These associations allowed G + A employees to see and apprehend several graphic styles influenced by the different pathways and professional experiences of each guest designer. These exchanges are not unrelated to the Swiss style adopted by G + A, which was a Canadian detonator and competed with major international agencies such as Pentagram in London, Total Design in the Netherlands or Unimark in Chicago.

Over the years, G + A opened several offices in America and Europe. In 1972, they moved to Toronto, then to New York in 1978. Gottschalk then went to Switzerland to establish an office in Zurich in 1979, while the Calgary office was inaugurated in 1997. Today, G + A still has offices in Toronto and Zurich. Ash retired in 2007 and sold Calgary and Toronto offices to DW + Partners, a business partnership that is actively involved in Canadian design development.

In 2012, Ash participated in the signing of the agreement between G + A and Entro; an environmental communication firm that occupies offices on every continent. They are recognized for associating frequently with renowned architects in order to design sustainable communication strategies adapted to contemporary trends in environmental design.

== Distinctions ==
1. Following the appearance of the visual identity for Expo 67, in addition to Canada's 100th birthday, Ash was awarded the Canadian Centennial Medal in 1968, a medal awarded to all Canadian professionals who contributed to the cultural, economic and advertising development of the country in this historic year.
2. In the same year 1968, he was the host of the annual congress of the Alliance Graphique Internationale held in Montreal.
3. Ash was also inducted into the Royal Canadian Academy of Arts in 1998 for the influence of his work across Canada.
4. In 2008, he received the Lifetime Achievement Award from the Society of Graphic Designers of Canada (SGDC), also known as the Fellowship Award, awarded to Canadian graphic designers who have contributed significantly to the development of the discipline or who have influenced and developed the field in Canada.
5. In 2011, he was honoured by the Communication Designers Association (CDA) for his career and for the legacy left by Gottschalk + Ash.

== Works ==
1. Canadian Centiennial Symbol's Visual Identity + Stationery - 1966
2. Visual Identity: Flatbush, Freedom 55, Ciba Specialty, Ontario Lottery Games, Labbat, Royal Bank of Canada, PATH, Skydome
3. The Quick, the Slick and the Familiar - 1995
4. Visual identity of Gottschalk+Ash - 1966
5. fhk henrion AGI Annals 1950 - 1980 - 1989
6. Mark for Champlain Container and Box Co. Ltd. 1967-1968
7. Cover of a booklet on a Roche tranquillizer for use in depressive states. Black and Blue 1967-1968
8. Umchlag und ganze Seite eines Falprospektes, mit dem sich eine Firma als Agentin für Künstler empfiehlt. Grün und Blau auf Shwarz. (1970-1971)
9. Cover (blue and red) and spread from an annual report of the Canada Council. (1970-1971)
10. Umchlag und Seite einer Sbell-Broschüre über einen Kunststoff. Schwarz und Rot. (1973-1974)
