= Jugerum =

Roman unit of area

The jugerum or juger (Latin: iūgerum, iūgera, iūger, or iugus) (Note: The form iugus as a neuter noun of the third declension is very common in the oblique cases and in the plural.) was a Roman unit of area, equivalent to a rectangle 240 Roman feet in length and 120 feet in width (about 71×35 1/2 m), i.e. 28,800 square Roman feet (Latin: pedes quadratum) or about 1/4 hectare (0.623 acre).

== Name ==
It was the double of the square actus, and from this circumstance, according to some writers, it derived its name. It seems probable that, as the word was evidently originally the same as iugum, a yoke, and as actus, in its original use, meant a path wide enough to drive a single beast along, that iugerum originally meant a path wide enough for a yoke of oxen, namely, the double of the actus in width; and that when actus quadratus was used for a square measure of surface, the iugerum, by a natural analogy, became the double of the actus quadratus; and that this new meaning of it superseded its old use as the double of the single actus.

Pliny the Elder states:

That portion of land used to be known as a "jugerum," which was capable of being ploughed by a single "jugum," or yoke of oxen, in one day; an "actus" being as much as the oxen could plough at a single spell, fairly estimated, without stopping. This last was one hundred and twenty feet in length; and two in length made a jugerum.

Pliny (Book VIII, Chapter 16) also used jugerum as a measure of length. The translator (Bostock) speculated that the jugerum length measurement was equivalent to the Greek plethron, about 30 meters or 100 feet. This was based on Pliny translating Aristotle's "plethron" to "jugerum".

The uncial division as was applied to the iugerum, its smallest part being the scrupulum of 100 sq ft or 9.2 m². Thus, the iugerum contained 288 scrupula (Varro, R. R. l.c.). The iugerum was the common measure of land among the Romans. Two iugera formed an heredium, a hundred heredia a centuria, and four centuriae a saltus. These divisions were derived from the original assignment of landed property, in which two iugera were given to each citizen as heritable property.

Columella states:

The square actus is bounded by 120 feet each way: when doubled it forms a iugerum, and it has derived the name iugerum from the fact that it was formed by joining.

In Gaul, half of a jugerum was called an arepennis ("head of a furrow”). It was the measure of a plowed furrow before the plowman turned the plow to cut a new parallel furrow. It was the origin of the later French unit of area, the arpent.

== See also ==
- Ancient Roman units of measurement
