= Ancient Roman units of measurement =

System of measurement used in Ancient Rome

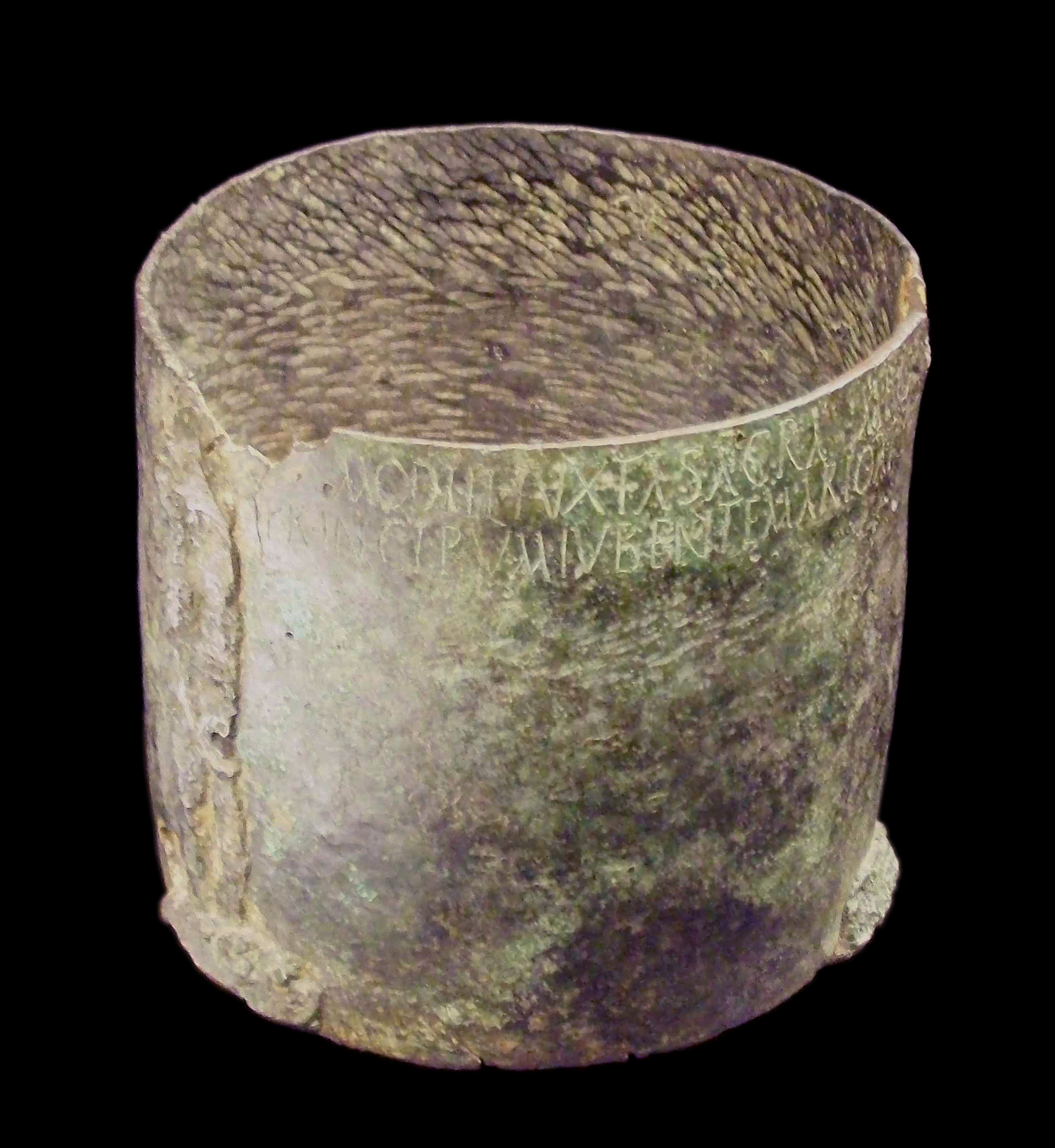
Bronze modius measure (4th century AD) with inscription acknowledging Imperial regulation of weights and measures

The units of measurement of ancient Rome were generally consistent and well documented.

== Length ==
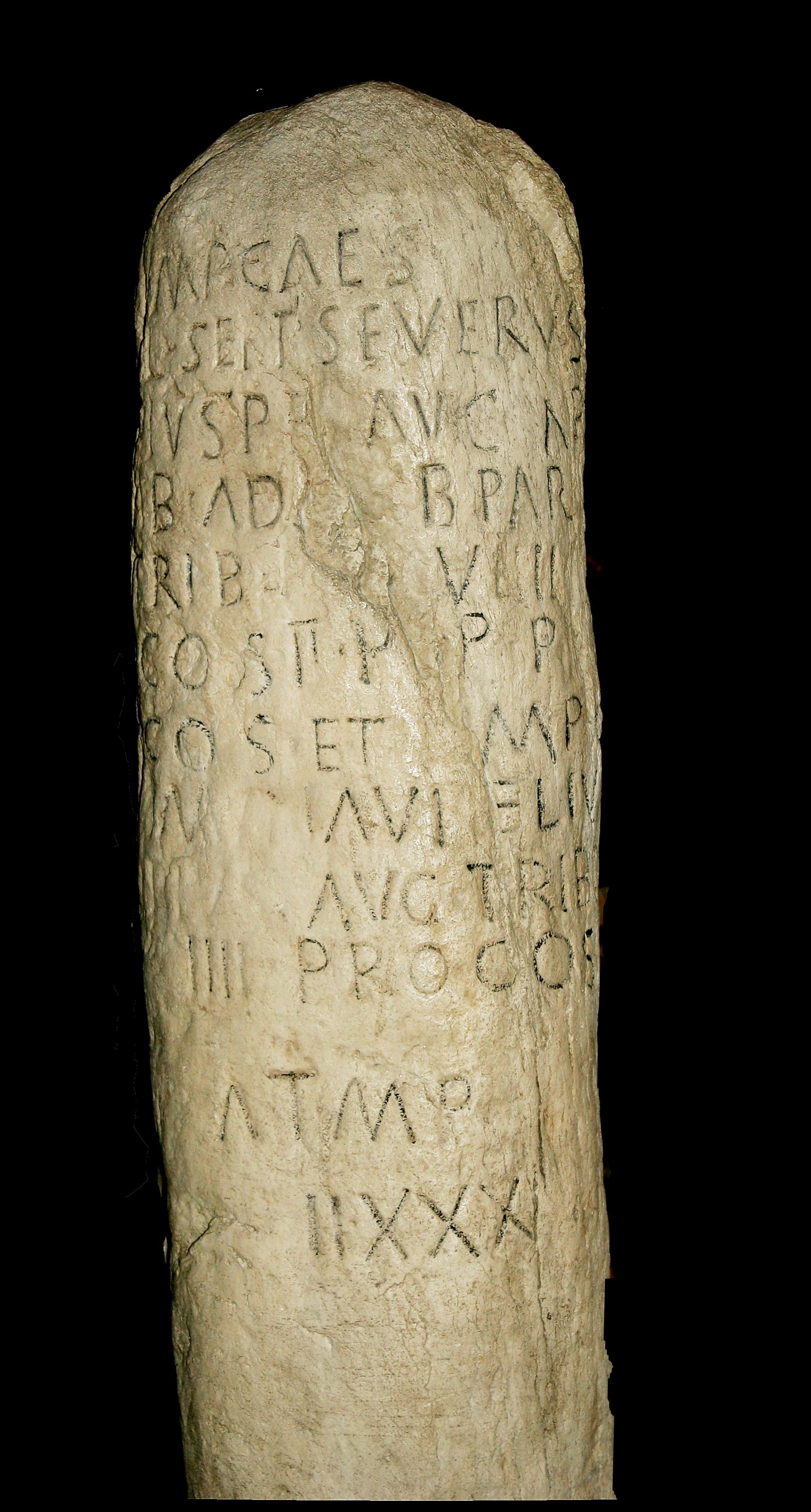
Roman milestone in modern Austria (AD 201), indicating a distance of 28 Roman miles (~41 km) to Teurnia

The basic unit of Roman linear measurement was the pes (plural: pedes) or Roman foot. Investigation of its relation to the English foot goes back at least to 1647, when John Greaves published his Discourse on the Romane foot. Greaves visited Rome in 1639, and measured, among other things, the foot measure on the tomb of Titus Statilius Aper, that on the statue of Cossutius formerly in the gardens of Angelo Colocci, the congius of Vespasian previously measured by Villalpandus, a number of brass measuring-rods found in the ruins of Rome, the paving-stones of the Pantheon and many other ancient Roman buildings, and the distance between the milestones on the Appian Way. He concluded that the Cossutian foot was the "true" Roman foot, and reported these values compared to the iron standard of the English foot in the Guildhall in London

Values of the ancient Roman foot determined by Greaves in 1639
Source	Reported value in English feet	Metric equivalent
Foot on the statue of Cossutius	0.967	295 mm
Foot on the monument of Statilius	0.972	296 mm
Foot of Villalpandus, derived from Congius of Vespasian	0.986	301 mm

William Smith (1851) gives a value of 0.9708 English feet, or about 295.9 mm. An accepted modern value is 296 mm. That foot is also called the pes monetalis to distinguish it from the pes Drusianus (about 333 or 335 mm) sometimes used in some provinces, particularly Germania Inferior.

The Roman foot was sub-divided either like the Greek pous into 16 digiti or fingers; or into 12 unciae or inches. Frontinus writes in the 1st century AD that the digitus was used in Campania and most parts of Italy. The principal Roman units of length were:

Ancient Roman units of length
Roman unit	English name	Equal to	Metric equivalent	Imperial equivalent	Notes
digitus	finger	1/16 pes	18.5 mm	0.728 in 0.0607 ft	
uncia pollex	inch thumb	1/12 pes	24.6 mm	0.971 in 0.0809 ft	
palmus (minor)	palm	1/4 pes	74 mm	0.243 ft	
palmus maior	palm length (lit."greater palm")	3/4 pes	222 mm	0.728 ft	in late times
pes (plural: pedes)	(Roman) foot	1 pes	296 mm	0.971 ft	sometimes distinguished as the pes monetalis (Note: The pes Drusianus, 333 or 335 mm, was sometimes used in Roman provinces, particularly Germania Inferior.)
palmipes	foot and a palm	1 1/4 pedes	370 mm	1.214 ft	
cubitum	cubit	1 1/2 pedes	444 mm	1.456 ft	
gradus pes sestertius	step	2 1/2 pedes	0.74 m	2.427 ft	
passus	pace	5 pedes	1.48 m	4.854 ft	
decempeda pertica	perch	10 pedes	2.96 m	9.708 ft	
actus	path, track	120 pedes	35.5 m	116.496 ft	24 passus or 12 decembeda
stadium	stade	625 pedes	185 m	607.14 ft	600 Greek feet or 125 passus or 1/8 mille
mille passus mille passuum	(Roman) mile	5,000 pedes	1.48 km	4,854 ft 0.919 mi	1000 passus or 8 stadia
leuga leuca	(Gallic) league	7,500 pedes	2.22 km	7,281 ft 1.379 mi	
Except where noted, based on Smith (1851). English and metric equivalents are approximate, converted at 1 pes = 0.9708 English feet and 296 mm respectively.

Other units include the schoenus (from the Greek for "rush rope") used for the distances in Isidore of Charax's Parthian Stations (where it had a value around 5 km or 3 miles) and in the name of the Nubian land of Triacontaschoenus between the First and Second Cataracts on the Nile (where it had a value closer to 10.5 km or 6 1/2 miles).

== Area ==
The ordinary units of measurement of area were:

Ancient Roman units of area
Roman unit	English name	Equal to	Metric equivalent	Imperial equivalent	Description
pes quadratus	square foot	1 pes qu.	0.0876 m^{2}	0.943 sq ft	
scrupulum or decempeda quadrata		100 pedes qu.	8.76 m^{2}	94.3 sq ft	the square of the standard 10-foot measuring rod
actus simplex		480 pedes qu.	42.1 m^{2}	453 sq ft	4 × 120 pedes
uncia		2,400 pedes qu.	210 m^{2}	2,260 sq ft	
clima		3,600 pedes qu.	315 m^{2}	3,390 sq ft	60 × 60 pedes
actus quadratus or acnua		14,400 pedes qu.	1,262 m^{2}	13,600 sq ft	also called arpennis in Gaul
jugerum		28,800 pedes qu.	2,523 m^{2}	27,200 sq ft 0.623 acres	
heredium		2 jugera	5,047 m^{2}	54,300 sq ft 1.248 acres	
centuria		200 jugera	50.5 ha	125 acres	formerly 100 jugera
saltus		800 jugera	201.9 ha	499 acres	
modius			16 ha	40 acres	Medieval Latin, plural modii
Except where noted, based on Smith (1851). Metric equivalents are approximate, converted at 1 pes = 296 mm.

Other units of area described by Columella in his De Re Rustica include the porca of 180 × 30 Roman feet (about 473 m^{2} or 5,090 sq ft) used in Hispania Baetica and the Gallic candetum or cadetum of 100 feet in the city or 150 in the country. Columella also gives uncial divisions of the jugerum, tabulated by the anonymous translator of the 1745 Millar edition as follows:

Uncial divisions of the jugerum
Roman unit	Roman square feet	Fraction of jugerum	Metric equivalent	Imperial equivalent	Description
dimidium scrupulum	50	1/576	4.38 m^{2}	47.1 sq ft	
scrupulum	100	1/288	8.76 m^{2}	94.3 sq ft	
duo scrupula	200	1/144	17.5 m^{2}	188 sq ft	
sextula	400	1/72	35.0 m^{2}	377 sq ft	
sicilicus	600	1/48	52.6 m^{2}	566 sq ft	
semiuncia	1,200	1/24	105 m^{2}	1,130 sq ft	
uncia	2,400	1/12	210 m^{2}	2,260 sq ft	
sextans	4,800	1/6	421 m^{2}	4,530 sq ft	
quadrans	7,200	1/4	631 m^{2}	6,790 sq ft	
triens	9,600	1/3	841 m^{2}	9,050 sq ft	
quincunx	12,000	5/12	1,051 m^{2}	11,310 sq ft	
semis	14,400	1/2	1,262 m^{2}	15,380 sq ft	= actus quadratus
septunx	16,800	7/12	1,472 m^{2}	15,840 sq ft	
bes	19,200	2/3	1,682 m^{2}	18,100 sq ft	
dodrans	21,600	3/4	1,893 m^{2}	20,380 sq ft	
dextans	24,000	5/6	2,103 m^{2}	22,640 sq ft	
deunx	26,400	11/12	2,313 m^{2}	24,900 sq ft	
jugerum	28,800	1	2,523 m^{2}	27,160 sq ft	
Except where noted, based on Millar (1745). Metric equivalents are approximate, converted at 1 pes = 296 mm.

== Volume ==
Both liquid and dry volume measurements were based on the sextarius. The sextarius was defined as 1/48 of a cubic pes (Roman foot), known as an amphora quadrantal. Using the value 296 mm (11.7 in) for the Roman foot, an amphora quadrantal can be computed at approximately 25.9 L (5.7 imp gal; 6.8 US gal), so a sextarius (by the same method) would theoretically measure 540.3 ml (19.02 imp fl oz; 18.27 US fl oz), which is about 95% of an imperial pint (568 ml).

Archaeologically, however, the evidence is not as precise. No two surviving vessels measure an identical volume, and scholarly opinion on the actual volume ranges between 500 and 580 ml (17–20 US fl oz).

The core volume units are:

- amphora quadrantal (Roman jar) – one cubic pes (Roman foot)
- congius – a half-pes cube (thus 1/8 amphora quadrantal)
- sextarius – literally 1/6 of a congius

=== Liquid measure ===
Ancient Roman liquid measures
Roman unit	Equal to	Metric	Imperial	US fluid
ligula	1/288 congius	11.4 mL	0.401 fl oz	0.385 fl oz
cyathus	1/72 congius	45 mL	1.58 fl oz	1.52 fl oz
acetabulum	1/48 congius	68 mL	2.39 fl oz	2.30 fl oz
quartarius	1/24 congius	136 mL	4.79 fl oz	4.61 fl oz
hemina or cotyla	1/12 congius	273 mL	9.61 fl oz	9.23 fl oz
sextarius	1/6 congius	546 mL	19.22 fl oz 0.961 pt	18.47 fl oz 1.153 pt
congius	1 congius	3.27 L	5.75 pt 0.719 gal	3.46 qt 0.864 gal
urna	4 congii	13.1 L	2.88 gal	3.46 gal
amphora quadrantal	8 congii	26.2 L	5.76 gal	6.92 gal
culeus	160 congii	524 L	115.3 gal	138.4 gal
Except where noted, based on Smith (1851). Modern equivalents are approximate.

=== Dry measure ===
Ancient Roman dry measures
Roman unit	Equal to	Metric	Imperial	US dry
ligula	1/288 congius	11.4 ml	0.401 fl oz	0.0207 pt
cyathus	1/72 congius	45 ml	1.58 fl oz	0.082 pt
acetabulum	1/48 congius	68 ml	2.39 fl oz	0.124 pt
quartarius	1/24 congius	136 ml	4.79 fl oz	0.247 pt
hemina or cotyla	1/12 congius	273 ml	9.61 fl oz	0.496 pt
sextarius	1/6 congius	546 ml	19.22 fl oz 0.961 pt	0.991 pt
semimodius	1 1/3 congii	4.36 L	0.96 gal	0.99 gal
modius	2 2/3 congii	8.73 L	1.92 gal	1.98 gal
modius castrensis	4 congii	12.93 L	2.84 gal	2.94 gal
Except where noted, based on Smith (1851). Modern equivalents are approximate.

== Weight ==
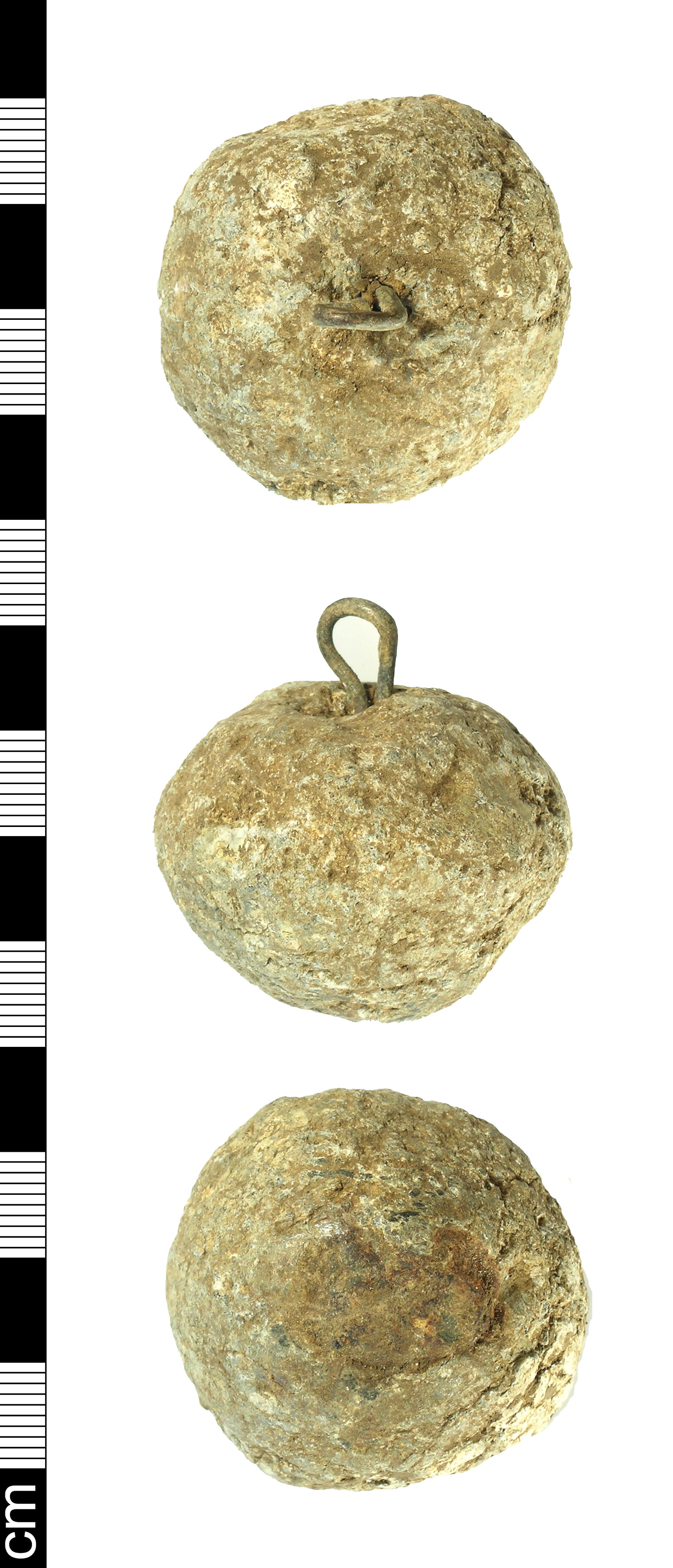
A Roman steelyard weight of one dodrans, i.e. 3/4 libra

The units of weight or mass were mostly based on factors of 12. Several of the unit names were also the names of coins during the Roman Republic and had the same fractional value of a larger base unit: libra for weight and as for coin. Modern estimates of the libra range from 322 to 329 g (11.4 to 11.6 oz) with 5076 grains or 328.9 g (11.60 oz) an accepted figure. The as was reduced from 12 ounces to 2 after the First Punic War, to 1 during the Second Punic War, and to half an ounce by the 131 BC Lex Papiria.

The divisions of the libra were:

Uncial divisions of the libra
Roman unit	English name	Equal to	Metric equivalent	Imperial equivalent	Description
uncia	Roman ounce	1/12 libra	27.4 g	0.967 oz	lit. "a twelfth"
sescuncia or sescunx		1/8 libra	41.1 g	1.45 oz	lit. "one and one-half twelfths"
sextans		1/6 libra	54.8 g	1.93 oz	lit. "a sixth"
quadrans teruncius		1/4 libra	82.2 g	2.90 oz	lit. "a fourth" lit. "triple twelfth"
triens		1/3 libra	109.6 g	3.87 oz	lit. "a third"
quincunx		5/12 libra	137.0 g	4.83 oz	lit. "five-twelfths"
semis or semissis		1/2 libra	164.5 g	5.80 oz	lit. "a half"
septunx		7/12 libra	191.9 g	6.77 oz	lit. "seven-twelfths"
bes or bessis		2/3 libra	219.3 g	7.74 oz	lit. "two [parts] of an as"
dodrans		3/4 libra	246.7 g	8.70 oz	lit. "less a fourth"
dextans		5/6 libra	274.1 g	9.67 oz	lit. "less a sixth"
deunx		11/12 libra	301.5 g	10.64 oz	lit. "less a twelfth"
libra	Roman pound libra		328.9 g	11.60 oz 0.725 lb	lit. "balance"
Except where noted, based on Smith (1851). Metric equivalents are approximate, converted at 1 libra = 328.9 g .

The subdivisions of the uncia were:

Subdivisions of the uncia
Roman unit	English name	Equal to	Metric equivalent	Imperial equivalent	Description
siliqua	carat	1/144 uncia	0.19 g	2.9 gr 0.0067 oz	lit. "carob seed" The Greek κεράτιον (kerátion)
obolus	obolus	1/48 uncia	0.57 g	8.8 gr 0.020 oz	lit. "obol", from the Greek word for "metal spit"
scrupulum	scruple	1/24 uncia	1.14 g	17.6 gr 0.040 oz	lit. "small pebble"
semisextula or dimidia sextula		1/12 uncia	2.28 g	35.2 gr 0.080 oz	lit. "half-sixth", "little sixth"
sextula	sextula	1/6 uncia	4.57 g	70.5 gr 0.161 oz	lit. "little sixth"
sicilicus or siciliquus		1/4 uncia	6.85 g	106 gr 0.242 oz	lit. "little sickle"
duella		1/3 uncia	9.14 g	141 gr 0.322 oz	lit. "little double [sixths]"
semuncia	half-ounce semuncia	1/2 uncia	13.7 g	211 gr 0.483 oz	lit. "half-twelfth"
uncia	Roman ounce		27.4 g	423 gr 0.967 oz	"a twelfth"
Except where noted, based on Smith (1851). Metric equivalents are approximate, converted at 1 libra = 328.9 g .

== Time ==
=== Years ===
The complicated Roman calendar was replaced by the Julian calendar in 45 BC. In the Julian calendar, an ordinary year is 365 days long, and a leap year is 366 days long. Between 45 BC and AD 1, leap years occurred at irregular intervals. Starting in AD 4, leap years occurred regularly every four years. Year numbers were rarely used; rather, the year was specified by naming the Roman consuls for that year. (As consuls' terms latterly ran from January to December, this eventually caused January, rather than March, to be considered the start of the year.) When a year number was required, the Greek Olympiads were used, or the count of years since the founding of Rome, "ab urbe condita" in 753 BC. In the Middle Ages, the year numbering was changed to the Anno Domini count, based on the supposed birth year of Jesus.

The calendar used in most of the modern world, the Gregorian calendar, differs from the Julian calendar in that it skips three leap years every four centuries (i.e. 97 leap years in every 400) to more closely approximate the length of the tropical year.

=== Weeks ===
The Romans grouped days into an eight-day cycle called the nundinae, with every eighth day being a market day.

Independent of the nundinae, astrologers kept a seven-day cycle called a hebdomas where each day corresponded to one of the seven classical planets, with the first day of the week being Saturn-day, followed by Sun-day, Moon-day, Mars-day, Mercury-day, Jupiter-day, and lastly Venus-day. Each astrological day was reckoned to begin at sunrise. The Jews also used a seven-day week, which began Saturday evening. The seventh day of the week they called Sabbath; the other days they numbered rather than named, except for Friday, which could be called either the Parasceve or the sixth day. Each Jewish day begins at sunset. Christians followed the Jewish seven-day week, except that they commonly called the first day of the week the Dominica, or the Lord's day. In 321, Constantine the Great gave his subjects every Sunday off, thus cementing the seven-day week into Roman civil society.

=== Hours ===
The Romans divided the daytime into twelve horae or hours starting at sunrise and ending at sunset. The night was divided into four watches. The duration of these hours varied with seasons; in the winter, when the daylight period was shorter, its 12 hours were correspondingly shorter and its four watches were correspondingly longer.

Astrologers divided the solar day into 24 equal hours, and these astrological hours became the basis for medieval clocks and our modern 24-hour mean solar day.

Although the division of hours into minutes and seconds did not occur until the Middle Ages, Classical astrologers had a minuta equal to 1/60 of a day (24 modern minutes), a secunda equal to 1/3600 of a day (24 modern seconds), and a tertia equal to 1/216,000 of a day (0.4 modern seconds).

== Unicode ==
A number of special symbols for Roman currency were added to the Unicode Standard version 5.1 (April 2008) as the Ancient Symbols block (U+10190–U+101CF, in the Supplementary Multilingual Plane).

Ancient Symbols^{[1]}^{[2]} Official Unicode Consortium code chart (PDF)
	0	1	2	3	4	5	6	7	8	9	A	B	C	D	E	F
U+1019x	𐆐	𐆑	𐆒	𐆓	𐆔	𐆕	𐆖	𐆗	𐆘	𐆙	𐆚	𐆛	𐆜			
U+101Ax	𐆠															
U+101Bx																
U+101Cx																
Notes 1.As of Unicode version 17.0 2.Grey areas indicate non-assigned code points

As mentioned above, the names for divisions of an as coin (originally one libra of bronze) were also used for divisions of a libra, and the symbols U+10190–U+10195 are likewise also symbols for weights:

- U+10190 (𐆐): Sextans
- U+10191 (𐆑): Uncia
- U+10192 (𐆒): Semuncia
- U+10193 (𐆓): Sextula
- U+10194 (𐆔): Semisextula
- U+10195 (𐆕): Siliqua

== See also ==
- Ancient Egyptian units
- Ancient Greek units
- Biblical and Talmudic units of measurement
- Byzantine units
- History of measurement
