= Neil Fraser (civil servant) =

Canadian former civil servant

Neil Fraser (born c. 1934) is a Canadian former civil servant who came to prominence for his crusade against the Metric system of weights and measures in the early 1980s, which resulted in him being fired from his post in the Department of National Revenue on February 23, 1982.

== Legal battle ==
Fraser fought his dismissal with the Public Service Staff Relations Board in April 1982, but the board ruled that his dismissal was justified. He appealed the board's decision to the Federal Court of Appeal, who dismissed his appeal in November 1982. Fraser then appealed this decision to the Supreme Court of Canada. The Court dismissed Fraser's appeal, agreeing that while public servants are allowed to express some degree of government criticism, it is possible to go so far as to impair the ability to do the job properly. The Court stated that Fraser's criticisms took on a "vitriolic tone, even to the point of being vicious" and he refused to stop.

== Candidate for 1983 Progressive Conservative leadership ==
To promote his campaign against the Metric system, he ran as a candidate for the leadership of the Progressive Conservative Party of Canada at the 1983 leadership convention.

Fraser's campaign had no visible followers. Granted the same nationally televised 25 minutes as the other candidates for his convention address, Fraser engaged in a bizarre speech that likened Confederation to a blood transfusion to Quebec. Lise Bissonnette commented that if the speech had been heard on Radio-Canada, it would have set the Tories' Quebec efforts back 10 years. He finished last, with five votes.
