= Metric Commission =

Branch of the Government of Canada

Metric Commission logo, used on many metric products in Canada during the 1970s and 1980s

The Metric Commission (French: Commission du système métrique), formally the Preparatory Commission for the Conversion to the Metric System, was a Canadian government agency established by the federal government in 1971 to facilitate Canada's conversion to the metric system from the imperial system of weights and measures and to educate the public on the metric system.

The Commission was formed following the release of "The White Paper on Metric Conversion", a January 1971 federal government document which noted most nations had adopted the metric system and anticipated that the United States would do likewise.

The commission's logo was designed by Gottschalk+Ash Toronto, designed by Stuart Ash, and licensed for use on any metric products (such as rulers). It is based on the logo of the 1967 Canadian Centennial by the same firm.

A number of Progressive Conservative Members of Parliament had vocally opposed the metric system during the previous Liberal government of Pierre Trudeau. Dennis Braithwaite of the Toronto Star criticized metrification in the media.

The agency was abolished on March 31, 1985, early in the mandate of a new Progressive Conservative government that came to office in the 1984 federal election. This followed the abolition of the United States Metric Board by President Ronald Reagan in 1982. The Metric Commission was replaced by a small metric office within Industry Canada. By October of that year, the metric office became the Measurement Information Division of Industry Canada, and staff numbers were significantly decreased. In April 1988, the Measurement Information Division was shut down. The Metric Commission Order remains in force under the Industry Canada Act and reports to the Minister of Consumer and Corporate Affairs.

== See also ==
- Imperial and US customary measurement systems
- Metrication in Canada
- Metrication in the United States
