= Esterlin =

Obsolete French unit of mass, stands for 1.5138 gram

The esterlin is an obsolete French unit of mass weighing about 1.5138 gram. It was used as a unit of mass for gold in France weighing 28 ½ Grain. In the Austrian Netherlands its place in the unit-chain was

- 1 livre or pond/pound = 2 mark = 16 once = 320 esterlin = 1280 felins = 10240 aß = 1 pond troy of Holland
- 1 pond = 320 esterlin = 49.215,18 centigram

In Belgium, it was valid that 1 livre = 1000 esterlin = 1000 gram
