= Centuria (unit of measure) =

During centuriation (Ancient Roman land surveying), centuria was a basic unit of area, representing a square of 20 actus (710 meters, 2400 Roman feet) on a side (an area of about 50 hectares). The name derives from the fact that in new colonies each centuria can be subdivided into 100 lots of heredium size (equal to two jugera each, or about 0.5 hectare) that were typically allocated to 100 families of colonists.

Although the "normal" size of centuria (20x20 actus = 200 jugera) was dominant, the contemporary Roman sources as well as modern archeological results suggest that centuria varied in size from 50 to 400 jugera, with some subdivisions using non-square plots. Written sources describe centuria as large as 80x16 actus = 640 jugera in Luceria, although Flach considers this record "not credible".

Despite the Roman foot definitions varying by time and geography, the surviving centuriation divisions are consistent, with normal size centuria side measurements from 703 meters in Chott el Djerid to 711 meters in Emilia. Centuria was too big for town planning, so smaller units were used for laying out the insula (city blocks): either actus or varying ones (usually rounded to the next passus, 5 feet, or pertica, 10 feet).

== Sources ==
- Lugli, E. (2019). The Making of Measure and the Promise of Sameness. University of Chicago Press. ISBN 978-0-226-61252-2.
- Duncan-Jones, R. P. (1980). "Length-Units in Roman Town Planning: The Pes Monetalis and the Pes Drusianus". Britannia. 11. JSTOR: 127–133. doi:10.2307/525675. ISSN 0068-113X.
- Dilke, O.A.W. (1987). Mathematics and Measurement. Reading the past. University of California Press. ISBN 978-0-520-06072-2.
- Flach, D. (1990). Römische Agrargeschichte. Handbuch der Altertumswissenschaft (in German). Verlag C. H. Beck. ISBN 978-3-406-33989-9.
