= Metrication Ordinance =

Legislation of Hong Kong

Legislative Council of Hong Kong
- Long title: An Ordinance to provide for the replacement in enactments of non-metric units by metric units and for matters connected therewith.
- Citation: Cap. 214
- Enacted by: Legislative Council of Hong Kong
- Commenced: 9 July 1976

Legislative history
- Introduced by: Financial Secretary Charles Philip Haddon-Cave
- Introduced: 11 June 1976
- First reading: 23 June 1976
- Second reading: 7 July 1976
- Third reading: 7 July 1976
- Status: Current legislation

The Metrication Ordinance (Chinese: 十進制條例; Jyutping: sap6 zeon3 zai3 tiu4 lai6) was enacted in 1976 in Hong Kong. The law allowed a gradual replacement of the Imperial units and Chinese units of measurement in favour of the International System of Units Metric System. The adoption was facilitated under the government's Metrication Committee.

Decades after the enactment of the law, Hong Kong still has not yet fully completed the metrication process. Wet markets continue to use Chinese or imperial units, and the square foot is still used for floor area.
