= Scrupulum =

Roman unit of mass

Scrupulum, meaning a tiny stone (from scrupus sharp stone), indicates a weight of 1/24 of a Roman ounce (i.e.) or, by extension, of other measures. Metaphorically, the stone is thought to be sharp and pricking, like a thorn.

- As a weight or a coin, 1/24 of an uncia, or 1/288 of an as; i.e. 1.14 grams
- As a measure of land, 1/288 of a jugerum; i.e. about 9 m^{2} (97 sq ft)
- As a measure of time, 1/24 part of an hour, or 2 1/2 minutes.

The forms scripulum, scriptulum, scriplus and scriptulus can be found, scriptulum being also associated with the lines on a draughtboard.

== See also ==
- Roman currency
