= Nelson Hawks =

American printer and typefoinder

Nelson Crocker Hawks (1840–1929) was born in Milwaukee, Wisconsin, United States on August 21, 1840. He is notable for establishing the six-per-inch pica (of 12 points) typographical standard in America. (An almost identical system, the cicero or "French pica"'—also six-per-(French) inch—was first used by Pannartz and Sweynheim in 1468 and subsequently by European printers.) This system was first used by American type foundries to make the standard-sized letter-blocks used by printers, and now by font designers to make the digital fonts on computers. He held that there should be a standard measurement system for printing, and promoted the idea.

Throughout Hawks's childhood he aspired to become a printer and by the age of 16 he had found employment as a printer's devil (colloquial; apprentice). By the age of 18 had started his own newspaper.

In 1874 Hawks moved to San Francisco where he established the Pacific Type Foundry in partnership with Marder, Luse, & Co., type founders of Chicago. In the late 1870s, while head of the Pacific Type Foundry, he developed his point system based on seventy-two points to an inch. He first proposed the system to John Marder when Marder visited California in 1877. Although, like most type founders, Marder was reluctant to accept it, he was convinced by Hawk's persistence. Official announcement from Marder, Luse and Company came in 1879 after it had several new type faces available using the new point system.

Hawks refused to patent the system, insisting that it be a "free gift for the benefit of the trade." After resigning from his partnership with Marder, Luse and Company in 1882, he worked tirelessly to advance the point system and have it adopted by other type foundries. By 1902 not only had most foundries in the United States adopted the system, but the British Associated Type Founders had begun using it.

During the 1860s and after there were at least 30 type foundries in America producing hand set type (before the advent of automation or keyboards), and each one had their own way to measure. It was through the persistent efforts of Nelson Hawks that the many foundries in the United States were convinced that the point system should be adopted. After his system became universal in the United States and the United Kingdom, revolutionizing the manufacture of printing type, he was honored by the American Type Founders Association at an event in New York City in 1892 where it was declared that Hawks's system, "...marks a New Era in the History of Typography, and is the most important improvement in type making since the days Gutenberg". (Note: Speech given by 'Mr. Bright of the St. Louis Type Foundry' before the American Type Founders Association, New York City in 1892, as quoted by Hawks in Explanation of the Point System of Printing Type with Specimens.)

He lived to see his system become the standard of the English-speaking world. At 80 years old he commented in regards to life: "The only benefit I have derived from it lies in the satisfaction of having been successful in giving the printing craft something useful and lasting." He died on July 2, 1929, at age 89.

There is however a strong connection between the Fournier-system and the American Pica. Benjamin Franklin bought from Fournier "matrices of an old foundry". Franklin had his grandson B. F. Bache instructed in the art by Fournier with the intent to establish an extensive foundry in Philadelphia. This foundry was no success, it was neglected and Bache abandoned it. After the Franklin died, the typefoundry tools came in possession of his relative Duane, who lend all materials to Binny & Ronaldson at that present the only foundry of importance in Philadelphia. Ronaldsson was impressed with the superiority of these tools, as was Binny. They made use of the Fourney mould for their pica. This standard was accepted by their successors L. Johnson & Co and the MacKellar, Smiths & Jordan Co. The slight deviation from the size of the Fournier-mould (4 points in one thousand) can be explained by the long-term use of the moulds in those days.

== See also ==
- Typographic unit – Units of measurement
- Traditional point-size names – Names used in printing
