= Typometer =

Typographic measuring device

Illustration of a typometer. The upper edge is marked with millimeters, half centimeters and centimeters; the lower edge is marked with a typographic point scale in groups of three, six and twelve points (one quarter cicero, half a cicero and one cicero)

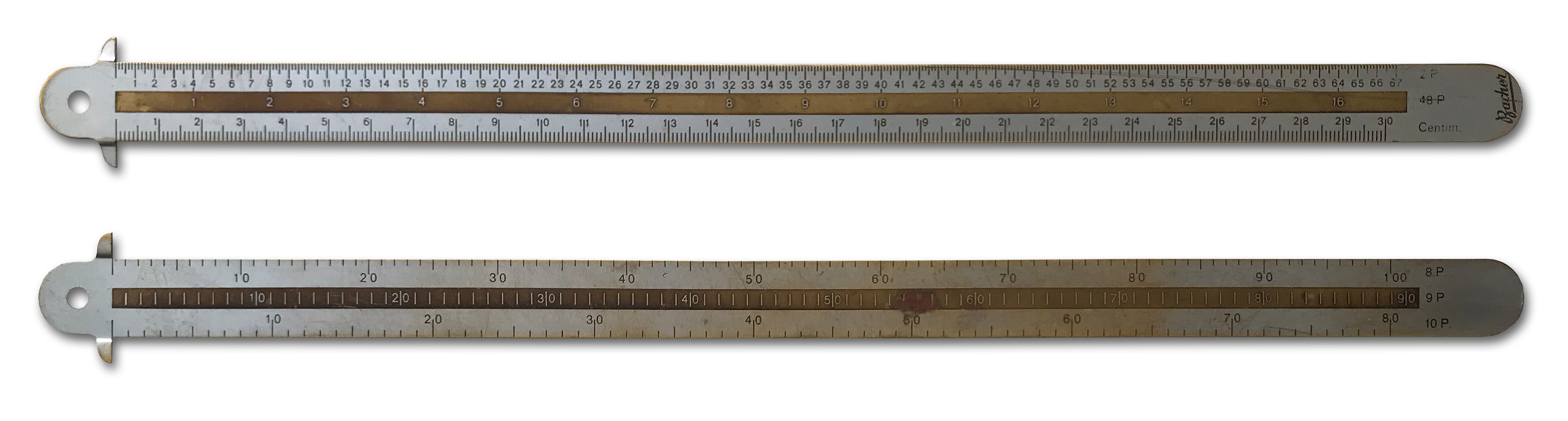
Front and back of an old metal typometer with a hook for manual type setting

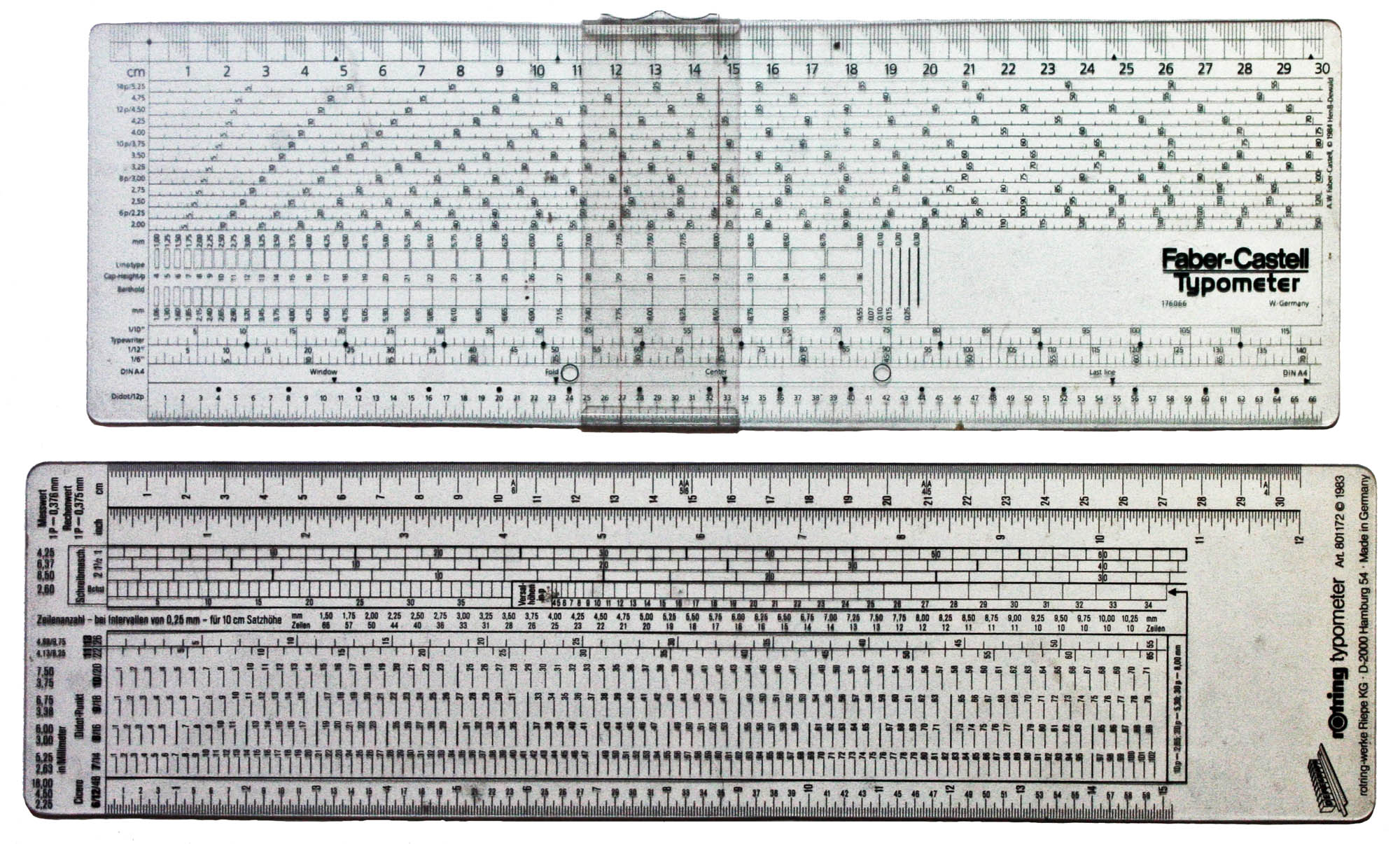
Plastic typometers, from the 1980s, with different scales

A typometer is a ruler which is usually divided in typographic points or ciceros on one of its sides and in centimeters or millimeters on the other, which was traditionally used in the graphic arts to inspect the measures of typographic materials. The most developed typometers could also measure the type size of a particular typeface, the leading of a text, the width of paragraph rules and other features of a printed text. This way, designers could study and reproduce the layout of a document.

One of the domains where the typometer was most widely used was the editorial offices of newspapers and magazines, where it was used along with other tools such as tracing paper and linen testers to define the layout of the pages of the publications, until the 1980s.

Typometers were initially made of wood or metal (in later times, of transparent plastic or acetate), and were produced in diverse shapes and sizes. Some of them presented several scales that were used to measure the properties of the text. Each scale corresponded with a type size or with a leading unit, if line blocks were divided by blank spaces. However, typometers could not be used to measure certain computer-generated type sizes, that could be set in fractions of points.

Due to the technological advancements in desktop publishing, that allow for a greater precision when setting the type size of texts, typometers have disappeared from most graphic design related professions. It keeps being used, even today, by traditional printers who still employ type metal.

== History ==
The idea of organising type sizes according to a particular point system first appeared during the 18th century, in the 1723 book La Science pratique de l'imprimerie, written by French printer and bookseller Martin-Dominique Fertel. In 1737, French engraver and typecaster Pierre-Simon Fournier (called Fournier the young) invented a tool in the shape of a square that he called prototype, which allowed him to accurately measure type sizes. He also stablished the Fournier point, that could be used for the first time to set a correlation between a type size and a constant number of points. According to his own words,

Pour faire la combinaison des corps, il suffit de savoir le nombre de points typographiques dont ils sont composés. Il faut pour cela que les points ou grandeurs données soient invariables, de manière qu'il puissent servir de guides dans l'imprimerie, comme le pied de roi, les pouces et les lignes en servent dans la géométrie.

In order to combine type sizes, one only needs to know the number of typographic points that compose them. For that, it's important that the points or measures that are given remain constant, so they can be used as guides in the printing press, in the same way that the king's foot, the thumbs and the lines are used in geometry.

— Pierre-Simon Fournier.

This way, in his Table des proportions (proportions table) published in 1737, Fournier the young proposed a scale consisting in 144 typographic points on which he distributed the type sizes that were commonly used in the printing press, which ranged from the Parisienne (the smallest size, with the exception of the Perle, which was rarely used) to the Grosse nonpareille (Great nonpareil, the largest size).

However, Fournier's prototype presented a major disadvantage, because its system of measures was very difficult to compare with the royal inches (pouces de roi) that were commonly used in France at the time. For this reason, French printer François-Ambroise Didot (1730–1804) created a simplified system, which he called typometer, and that he based on the pied du roi. This invention was first described in the book Essai de fables nouvelles, by Pierre Didot, François-Ambroise's son.

Didot's new measuring scale was divided in 288 typographic points, instead of the former 144, and described 12 type sizes, instead of the 20 or 22 listed by Fournier the young. As many of the sizes kept their names, but changed their dimensions, a great confusion ensued among printers, and some of them campaigned for a return to the older system. Nevertheless, the Didot points were progressively adopted until becoming the norm. This way of measuring type based in the mediaeval royal units prevailed even after the French Revolution, when the metric system was adopted by France.

In Germany, the French typographic point system was never properly implemented, which resulted in a wide variability of dimensions for type metal. In order to try to solve this situation, in 1879, German and Prussian printer and businessman Hermann Berthold proposed his own system to standardise typographic points based on the metric system. For that purpose, he divided a meter into 2660 identical typographic points. This measure, which is 0,0076 % wider than the Didot point, became the current reference for printing. From 1897 on, German manufacturer A. W. Faber started commercialising sliding rulers that allowed typographers to calculate in a simple manner the measures of their layouts.

== See also ==
- Typographic unit
