= Typographic unit =

Units of measurement

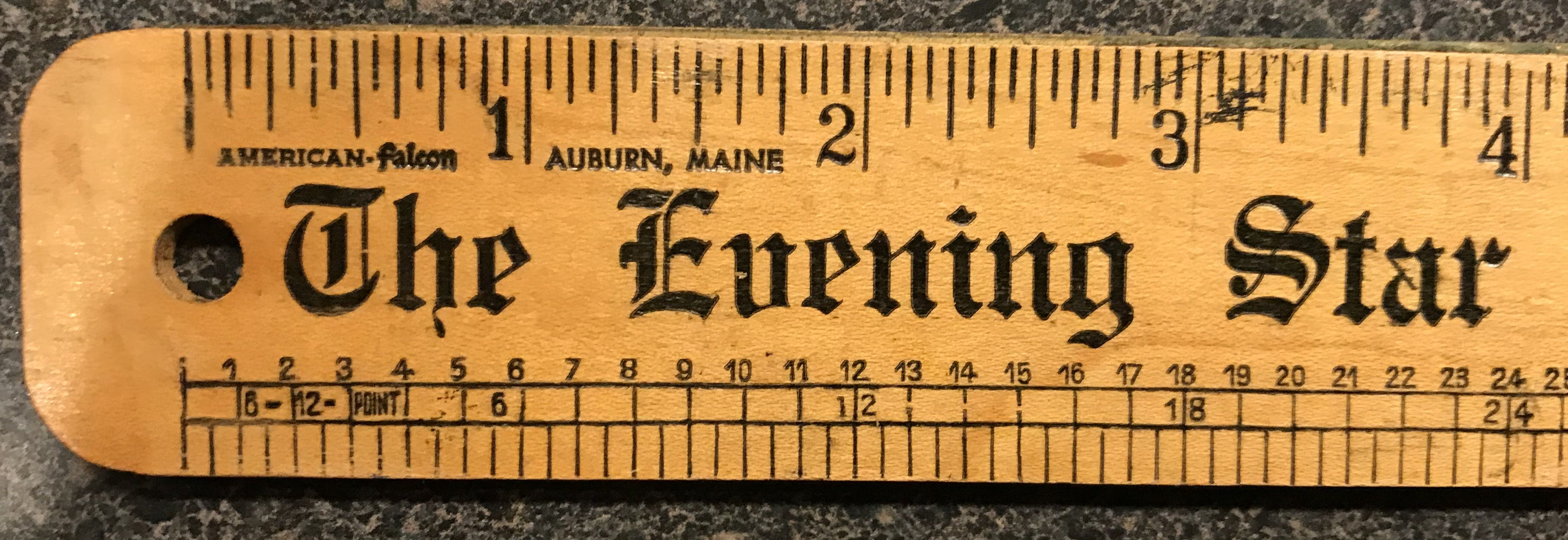
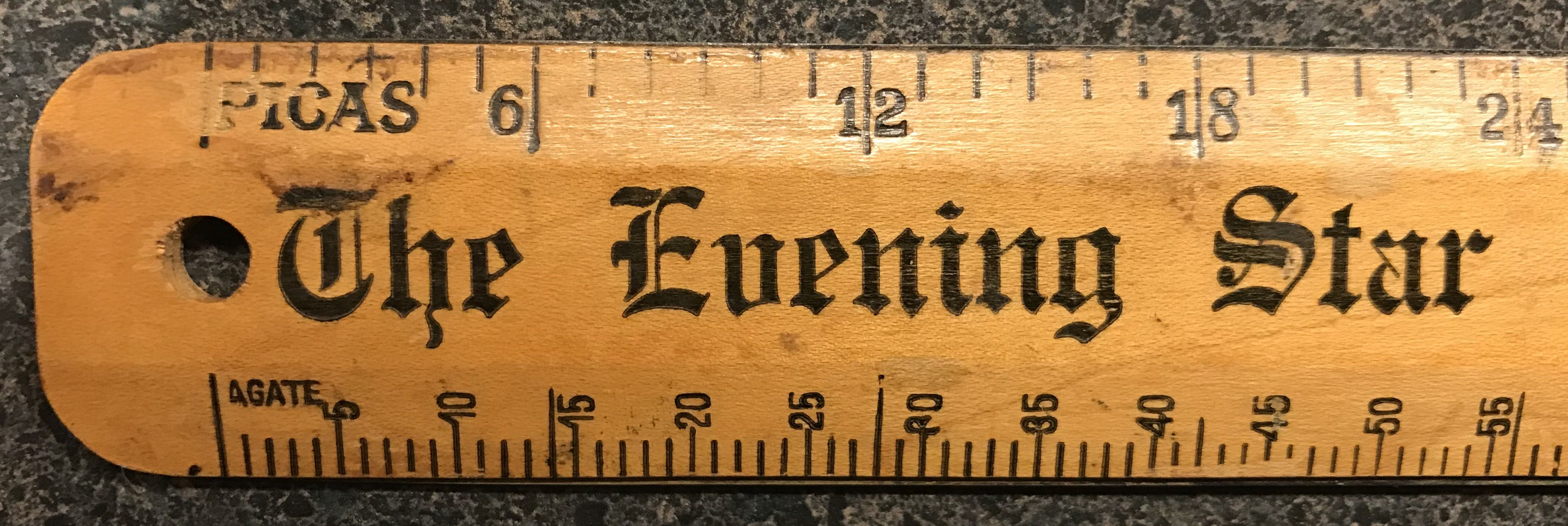
A ruler showing 4 scales (from the top down): Inches, Points, Picas, and Agates

Typographic units are the units of measurement used in typography or typesetting. Traditional typometry units are different from familiar metric units because they were established in the early days of printing. Though most printing is digital now, the old terms and units have persisted.

Even though these units are all very small, across a line of print they add up quickly. Confusions such as resetting text originally in type of one unit in type of another will result in words moving from one line to the next, resulting in all sorts of typesetting errors (viz. rivers, widows and orphans, disrupted tables, and misplaced captions). Before the popularization of desktop publishing, type measurements were done with a tool called a typometer.

== Development ==
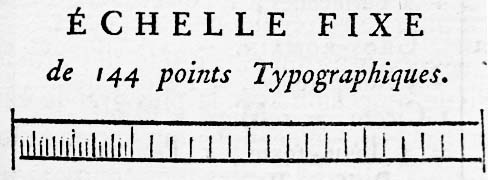
Fournier's printed scale of his point system, from Manuel Typographique, Barbou, Paris 1764, enlarged

In Europe, the Didot point system was created by François-Ambroise Didot (1730–1804) in c. 1783. Didot's system was based on the 1742 standard established for the Kingdom of France by Pierre Simon Fournier, but Didot modified Fournier's system by adjusting the base unit to a French Royal inch (pouce), whereas Fournier's unit was based on the traditional Paris inch.

However, the basic idea of the point system – to generate different type sizes by multiplying a single minimum unit calculated by dividing a base measurement unit such as one French Royal inch – was not Didot's invention, but Fournier's. (Note: Actually, Sebastien Truchet (1657–1729) had invented a similar type sizing system before Fournier implemented his point system. Truchet's system was applied to the types of the Imprimerie Royale, the romains du roi. It is thought that Fournier knew about Truchet's scheme that was based on the standard French Royal inch and a very fine unit of1/204 ligne. For further information on Truchet's system, refer to James Mosley's "The New Type Bodies of the Imprimerie Royale", pp. 400–408, Vol. 3, The Manuel Typographique of Pierre-Simon Fournier le jeune, Darmstadt 1995. and Jacques André's "Truchet & Types" .) In Fournier's system, an approximate French Royal inch (pouce) is divided by 12 to calculate 1 ligne, which is then divided by 6 to get 1 point. Didot just made the base unit (one French Royal inch) identical to the standard value defined by the government.

In Didot's point system:

- 1 point = 1/6 ligne = 1/72 French Royal inch = (15 625)/(41 559) mm ≤ 0.375 971 510 4 mm, however in practice mostly: 0.376 mm (i.e. + 0.0076%).

Both in Didot's and Fournier's systems, some point sizes have traditional names such as Cicero (before introduction of point systems, type sizes were called by names such as Cicero, Pica, Ruby, Great Primer, etc.).

- 1 cicero = 12 Didot points = 1/6 French Royal inch = (62 500)/(13 853) mm ≤ 4.511 658 124 6 mm, also in practice mostly: 4.512 mm (i.e. + 0.0076%).

The Didot point system has been widely used in European countries. An abbreviation for it that these countries use is "dd", employing an old method for indicating plurals. Hence "12 dd" means twelve didot points.

In Britain and the United States, many proposals for type size standardization had been made by the end of the 19th century (such as Bruce Typefoundry's mathematical system that was based on a precise geometric progression). However, no nationwide standard was created until the American Point System was decided in 1886.

The American Point System was proposed by Nelson C. Hawks of Marder Luse & Company in Chicago in the 1870s, and his point system used the same method of size division as Fournier's; viz. dividing 1 inch by six to get one pica, and dividing it again by 12 to get one point. However, the American Point System standardized finally in 1886 is different from Hawks's original idea in that one pica is not precisely equal to 1/6 inch (neither the Imperial inch nor the US inch), as the United States Type Founders' Association defined the standard pica to be the Johnson Pica, which had been adopted and used by Mackellar, Smiths and Jordan type foundry (MS&J), Philadelphia. As MS&J was very influential in those days, many other type foundries were using the Johnson Pica. (Note: Regarding the background of the adoption of the Johnson Pica, Mr. Richard L. Hopkins, author of Origin of The American Point System says: "The major issue then was the expense involved in re-tooling literally hundreds of molds in each foundry to make them all conform to the new system. If they could avoid just a few sizes being altered, it would save hundreds of thousands of dollars. That is why the MS&J (Johnson) pica was adopted.") Also, MS&J defined that 83 Picas are equal to 35 centimeters. The choice of the metric unit for the prototype was because at the time the Imperial and US inches differed in size slightly, and neither country could legally specify a unit of the other.

The Johnson Pica was named after Lawrence Johnson who had succeeded Binny & Ronaldson in 1833. Binny & Ronaldson was one of the oldest type foundries in the United States, established in Philadelphia in 1796. Binny & Ronaldson had bought the type founding equipment of Benjamin Franklin's (1706–1790) type foundry established in 1786 and run by his grandson Benjamin Franklin Bache (1769–1798). The equipment is thought to be that which Benjamin Franklin purchased from Pierre Simon Fournier when he visited France for diplomatic purposes (1776–85).

The official US standard approved by the Fifteenth Meeting of the Type Founders Association of the United States in 1886 was this Johnson pica, equal to exactly 0.166 inch.

Monotype wedges used in England and America were based on a pica = 0.1660 inch. But on the European continent all available wedges were based on the "old-pica" 1 pica - .1667 inch. These wedges were marked with an extra E behind the numbers of the wedge and the set. These differences can also be found in the tables of the manuals.

In the American point system:

- 1 Johnson pica = exactly 0.166 inch (versus 0.166̅ = 1/6 inch for the DTP-pica) = 4.2164 mm.
- 1 point = 1/12 pica = exactly 0.013 83̅ inch = 0.351 36̅ mm.

The American point system has been used in the US, Britain, Japan, and many other countries.

Today, digital printing and display devices and page layout software use a unit that is different from these traditional typographic units. On many digital printing systems (desktop publishing systems in particular), the following equations are applicable (with exceptions, most notably the popular TeX typesetting system and its derivatives).

- 1 pica = 1/6 inch (British/American inch of today) = 127/30 mm = 4.23̅ mm.
- 1 point = 1/12 pica = 1/72 inch = 127/360 mm = 0.3527̅ mm.

Digital displays and printing led to the use an additional unit:

- 1 twip = 1/20 point = 1/1440 inch = 127/7200 mm = 0.017 638̅ mm.

Fournier's original method of division is now restored in today's digital typography.

Comparing a piece of type in didots for Continental European countries – 12 dd, for example – to a piece of type for an English-speaking country – 12 pt – shows that the main body of a character is actually about the same size. The difference is that the languages of the former often need extra space atop the capital letters for accent marks (e.g. Ñ, Â, Ö, É), but English rarely needs this.

== Metric units ==
The traditional typographic units are based either on non-metric units, or on odd multiples (such as 35/83) of a metric unit. There are no specifically metric units for this particular purpose, although there is a DIN standard sometimes used in German publishing, which measures type sizes in multiples of 0.25 mm, and proponents of the metrication of typography generally recommend the use of the millimetre for typographical measurements, rather than the development of new specifically typographical metric units. The Japanese already do this for their own characters (using the kyu, which is q in romanized Japanese and is also 0.25 mm), and have metric-sized type for European languages as well. One advantage of the q is that it reintroduces the proportional integer division of 3 mm (12 q divides by 6 and 4).

During the age of the French Revolution or Napoleonic Empire, the French established a typographic unit of 0.4 mm, but except for the government's print shops, this did not catch on.

In 1973, the didot was restandardized in the EU as 0.375 (= >3/8) mm. Care must be taken because the name of the unit is often left unmodified. The Germans, however, use the terms Fournier-Punkt and Didot-Punkt for the earlier ones, and Typografischer Punkt for this metric one. The TeX typesetting system uses the abbreviation dd for the earlier definition, and nd for the metric new didot

== Notes ==
Diagram of font metrics showing where letters and symbols would be placed relative to each other. The letters would change size according to the font type, typographic unit and dimension used.

The line terms used in typography

== Select bibliography ==
- Boag, Andrew. "Typographic measurement: a chronology", Typography papers, no. 1, 1996, The Department of Typography and Graphic Communication, The University of Reading, Reading 1996.
- Bruce's Son & Company, Specimen of Printing Types, incl. Theo. L. DeVinne's "The Invention of Printing", New York 1878.
- Carter, Harry. Fournier on Typefounding, The Soncino Press, London 1930.
- Fournier, Pierre Simon, The Manuel Typographique of Pierre-Simon Fournier le jeune, Vols. I–III, Ed. by James Mosley, Darmstadt 1995.
- Fournier, Pierre Simon. Modèles des Caractères de l'Imprimerie, including James Mosley's introduction, Eugrammia Press, London 1965.
- Fournier, Pierre Simon. Manuel Typographique, Vols. I & II, Fournier & Barbou, Paris 1764–1766.
- Hansard, T. C. Typographia, Baldwin, Cradock, and Joy, London 1825.
- Hopkins, Richard L. Origin of The American Point System, Hill & Dale Private Press, Terra Alta 1976.
- Hutt, Allen. Fournier, the complete typographer, Rowman and Littlefield, Totowa, NJ 1972.
- Johnson, John. Typographia, Longman, Hurst, Rees, Orme, Brown & Green, London 1824.
- Jones, Thomas Roy, Printing in America, The Newcomen Society of England, American Branch, New York 1948.
- MacKellar Smiths & Jordan. One Hundred Years, Philadelphia 1896.
- Mosley, James. "French Academicians and Modern Typography: Designing New Types in the 1690s", Typography papers, no. 2, 1997, The Department of Typography and Graphic Communication, The University of Reading, Reading 1997.
- Moxon, Joseph. Mechanick Exercises On The Whole Art Of Printing, Oxford University Press, London 1958.
- Ovink, G. Willem. "From Fournier to metric, and from lead to film", Quaerendo, Volume IX 2 & 4, Theatrum Orbis Terrarum Ltd., Amsterdam 1979.
- Smith, John. The Printer's Grammar, L. Wayland, London 1787.
- Yamamoto, Taro. pt – Type Sizing Units Converter, http://www.kt.rim.or.jp/~tyamamot/pt.htm Tokyo 2001.
