= Agate (typography) =

Typographic unit; approximately 1.81 mm

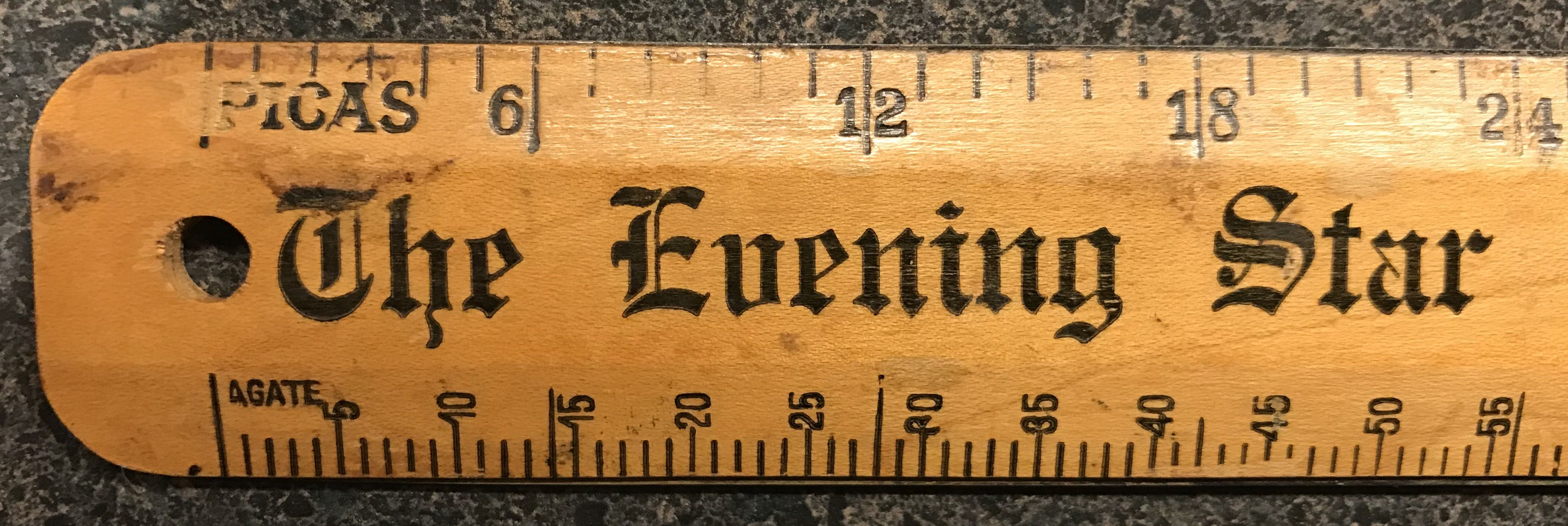
- A ruler showing Agate scale (on the bottom) and Pica scale (on the top)

General information
- Unit system: Typographic unit
- Unit of: Length

Conversions
| 1 agate in ... | ... is equal to ... |
- typographic units: = 5.5 points
- imperial/US units: = .07638̅ in
- ~1/13 in
- metric (SI) units: ~1.94 mm

An agate (US) or ruby (UK) is a unit of typographical measure. It is 5.5 typographical points, or about 1/13 inch (1.94 mm). It can refer either to the height of a line of type or to a font that is 5.5 points. An agate font is commonly used to display statistical data or legal notices in newspapers. It is considered to be the smallest point size that can be printed on newsprint and remain legible.

Due to the small size of agate compared to typical newspaper body text that might be 8 to 10 points and due to its use for statistical, stock, racing or other table uses, the term "agate" may also refer to tables and texts using this point size. The general description "agate" refers to the collection of miscellaneous tables, stock tables, horse racing and sports tables and so forth that may be in a newspaper.

From the American Dictionary of Printing and Bookmaking (1894):

Agate: A small size of printing-type, between pearl and nonpareil, half the size of small pica. A little over thirteen lines go to the inch. By the point system, it corresponds to five and a half points. Its chief use is for advertisements and market reports in daily papers, on which it is generally the smallest size used. It is also largely employed in time-tables. It was unknown before 1822, when George Bruce, who was endeavoring to have a truer relation between the bodies of type than then existed, saw the gap between pearl and nonpareil, and introduced this size to fill it. In England it is called ruby. Hansard's Typographia, published in 1825, says that a few years before it was by him absolutely necessary to give some distinguishing appellation to this size, as the founders had him one-nick pearls of two bodies, one of half small pica and one of half long primer. He therefore called the former ruby.

== See also ==
- Traditional point-size names
