= IC 3639 =

Galaxy in the constellation Centaurus

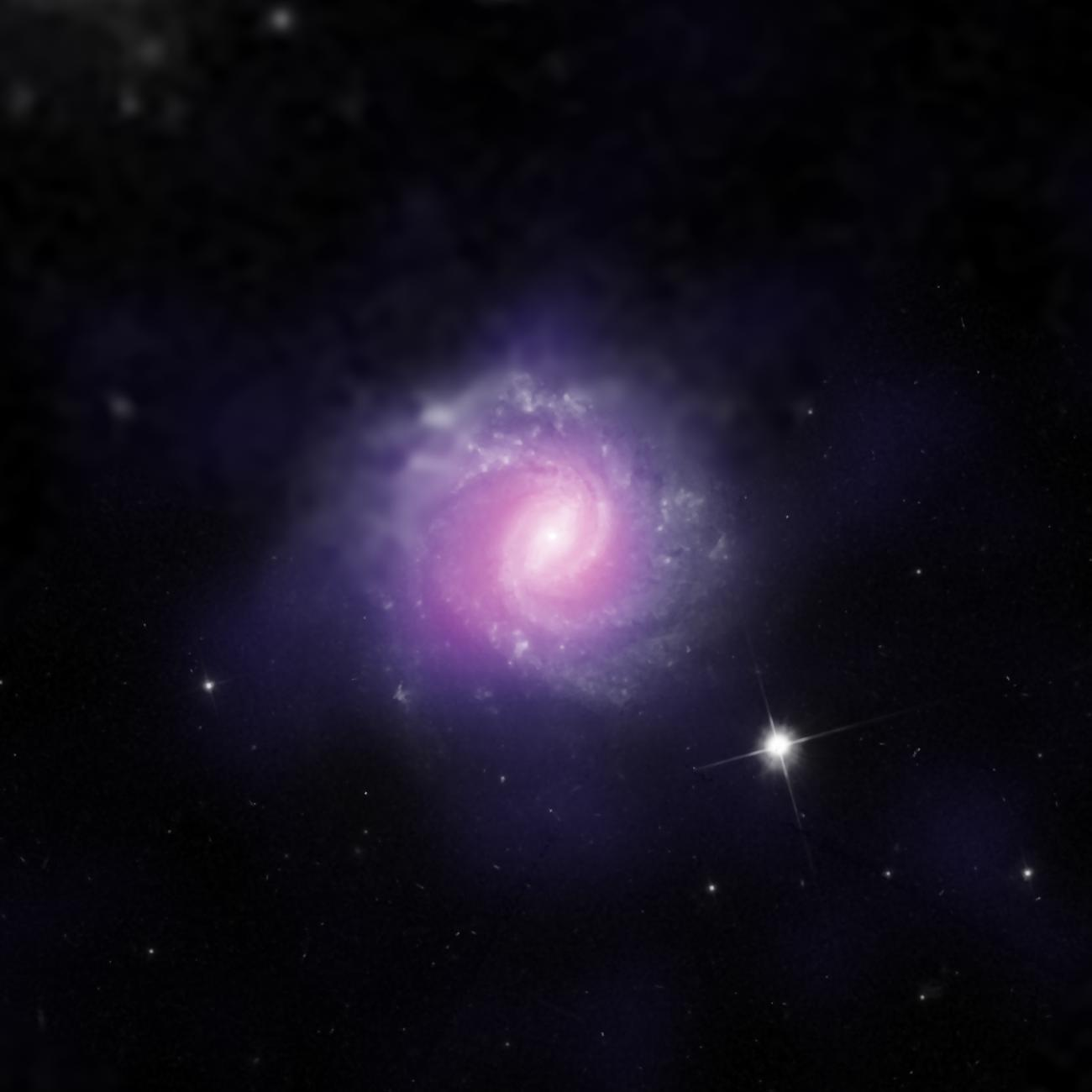
- Image of IC 3639 captured via HST and ESO

Observation data (J2000 epoch)
- Constellation: Centaurus
- Right ascension: 12^{h} 40^{m} 52.83^{s}
- Declination: −36° 45′ 20.97″
- Redshift: 0.010924
- Heliocentric radial velocity: 3275 ± 5 km/s
- Distance: 172.0 ± 12.1 Mly (52.73 ± 3.71 Mpc)
- Apparent magnitude (V): 12.2

Characteristics
- Type: SB(rs)bc: Sy2
- Size: ~57,000 ly (17.4 kpc) (estimated)

Other designations
- 6dF J1240529-364521, AM 1238-362 NED02, ESO 381- G 008, FAIRALL 0312, IRAS 12381-3628, PGC 42504, MCG -06-28-011, TOLOLO 1238-364, SUMSS J124052-364521

IC 3639 is a barred spiral galaxy located in the constellation of Centaurus. The redshift of the galaxy is (z) 0.010 and it was first discovered by the American astronomer Lewis Swift in February 1898. The galaxy has also been classified as a Seyfert galaxy and designated as Tol 1238-364.

== Description ==
IC 3639 is a Type SBb spiral galaxy. It is seen face-on. The H II regions of the galaxy are quite irregular, with no trace of any spiral structures. There is a galactic bar-shaped feature based on both K-band imaging and an ellipse fit measurement. Imaging made with the Hubble Space Telescope shows two spiral arms emerging from the edges of the bar, with the bar itself being orientated at a position angle of 150°. The galaxy is mainly undisturbed, with no signs of gravitational interaction, although it has two companions; an edge-on galaxy and a ring galaxy. All three galaxies form a galactic triplet called AM 1238-362 and belong to the CCG 1 galaxy group.

Hydrogen-alpha emission has been found in the galaxy, which is spread out over the disk area in multiple knot formations. The infrared star formation rate estimated for IC 3639 is 9.29 M_{ʘ} per year, although a study published in 2016 has estimated the star formation rate to be 12 M_{ʘ} per year.

The nucleus of IC 3639 is active and it has been categorized as a Seyfert type 2 galaxy based on its high infrared luminosity value of 10.35 L_{ʘ}. A study confirmed the nucleus is also a strong source of ultraviolet rays, with a source extent of around 192 × 96 square pica. The nuclear emission is further resolved into a substructure created by three regions; two lobe features formed through star formation and a central core feature associated with the galaxy's own active galactic nucleus. The total stellar mass of the galaxy has been estimated as 10.02 M_{ʘ}.
