= Lawrence Johnson (type-founder) =

British-American typographer

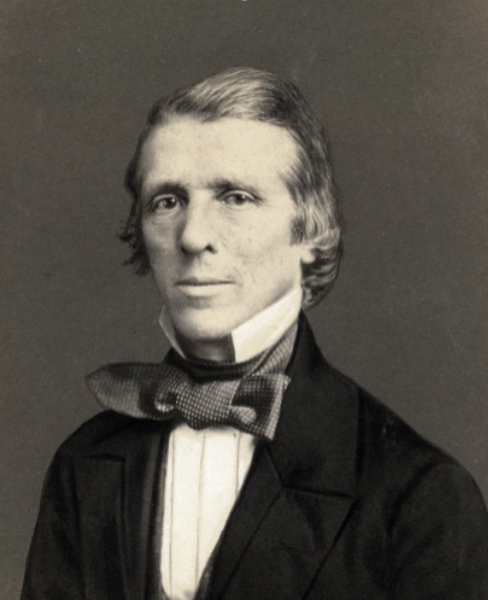
- Born: 23 January 1801; Kingston-upon-Hull, England
- Died: 24 April 1860 (aged 59); Philadelphia, Pennsylvania
- Resting place: St Thomas' Churchyard, Whitemarsh, Pennsylvania
- Citizenship: United States of America
- Occupation: Type-founder / businessman
- Known for: Stereotyping & type-founding
- Style: L. Johnson and Company; Johnson & Smith; The Johnson Type Foundry
- Spouses: Sarah Bacon Murray; Mary Winder
- Parent(s): Edward Johnson and Ann Clayton

Lawrence Johnson (23 January 1801 – 24 April 1860), was born and educated in England. After an early apprenticeship in the printing industry, he emigrated to the United States in his youth, and became a stereotyper and type-founder in Philadelphia and one of the most extensive and successful type-founders in the United States.

== Early life in England ==
Lawrence Johnson was born in Kingston-upon-Hull, England, on 23 January 1801, the second son and third child of Edward Johnson and Ann Clayton. He was baptised in Holy Trinity Church on 2 March 1801. Johnson was educated in Hull and in Bungay, Suffolk, England. At the age of twelve, he was sent to learn the printing and publishing business with the firm of Brightly and Childs, which was represented in Hull by his father, Edward. This firm, which operated a paper mill and an extensive printing office and stereotype foundry, was established in 1795, and was for many years among the largest printers and publishers of periodical works in Great Britain. He apprenticed with Brightly and Childs for several years until sailing with his parents for America in 1818.

== Professional life ==
=== Stereotyping and type foundry development ===
On arriving in America, Johnson secured a position in Troy, New York, with The Northern Budget, a Republican weekly newspaper. In spring 1819, he began working in New York City in the printing office of Bunce and Gray, often working sixteen to eighteen hours a day. Having observed the art of stereotype printing in England, where his first employer, Brightly and Childs, had been among the first to adopt it, Johnson sought to learn more about the practice, and in 1820 he entered the employment of B. & J. Collins, one of two firms that did nearly all of the stereotyping in New York. Having acquired a sufficient knowledge of stereotyping, he soon left for Philadelphia to establish his own enterprise. There, despite his limited means and knowledge, he managed to develop a successful stereotyping business. Initially his stereotype foundry was located at 17 Cypress Alley in Philadelphia. By the late 1820s it was located at 6 George Street (later renamed 606–608 Sansom Street), where it remained until 1906 when the property was sold to the Curtis Publishing Company. Prior to the establishment of Johnson's foundry, those publishers in Philadelphia who wanted to use stereotyping for book printing sent their orders to New York. One of Johnsons's earliest successful efforts in stereotyping was Henry's Commentary on the Scriptures for the publishers, Tower and Hogan.

Despite many challenges, during his first decade in Philadelphia Johnson developed and operated a large and prosperous stereotyping business. In 1833 he added type-founding to his operations when, in conjunction with George F. Smith, he bought The Philadelphia Type Foundry, originally established by Archibald Binny and James Ronaldson. The foundry had lost business to other type-foundries, having fallen into disrepair since its initial prosperity. Johnson made major extensions and improvements, and established a solid and successful enterprise. Ten years later, in 1843, George F. Smith retired from the type-foundry business, and for two years, Johnson operated both the type-foundry and the stereotype foundry under his exclusive ownership. In 1845, Johnson brought in three of his employees as junior partners: Thomas MacKellar, John F. Smith and Richard Smith. The business operated under the title of L. Johnson & Company, although it was commonly known as the "Johnson Type Foundry". In 1856, a branch foundry was established in Cincinnati, under the management of Robert Allison, who later became its owner.

After Johnson's death in 1860, Peter A. Jordon became a partner in the company, and in 1867, the name changed from L. Johnson and Company to MacKellar, Smiths and Jordon. Nonetheless, the operation was long known as the "Johnson Type Foundry". In 1892, the firm was incorporated with the American Type Founders' Company.

=== Innovations and contributions ===
During his tenure Johnson, oversaw several innovations in the business and made additional contributions to the art and practice of type-founding. Johnson adopted the new art of electrotyping, a higher quality process for making printing plates to stereotyping, as soon as it became available. The Johnson Type Foundry was greatly enlarged and developed a wide variety of type. In 1858, the firm supported a revival of William Caslon's old-style types by bringing the matrices to the United States from England.

In 1844, the Johnson Type Foundry published the first extensive specimen book in an octavo volume of about four hundred pages. This specimen book far exceeded any others of that time in quality and extent, having "no superior in the world of typography". Specimen books showed the numerous varieties of types made in a foundry, but the originality of the type and presentation in the Johnson Foundry book attracted the attention of printers everywhere, and other foundries soon followed suit by increasing the size of their publications. In 1849, the Johnson Foundry issued the first quarto specimen book ever published. In this edition, the letters and type, for the first time, were presented in full words and phrases increasing the appeal of the presentation. This innovation was soon adopted by many of the type-founders in the United States. The firm continued to produce new and unique specimen books well after Johnson's death. In 1855, L. Johnson & Company began the Typographic Advertiser, the first printer's paper devoted to printing and typography in the United States, and a means to show new productions of the Johnson Foundry.

Johnson was a member of the Philadelphia Typographical Society, to which he made significant contributions. Late in his life, Johnson, along with other leading type-founders of Philadelphia successfully petitioned Congress to modify copyright law to extend protection to letter-cutters, engravers, and originators of designs. In 1886, the Type Founders Association of the United States chose the dimensions of the Johnson Pica, named after Lawrence Johnson, as the official standard for the pica unit of length.

=== Other business interests ===
Johnson was involved in many other enterprises in Philadelphia and elsewhere, including the development of coal mining, the building of street-car lines and banking. He was president of the Commonwealth Bank of Philadelphia, and a director of The Green and Coates Street Passenger Railway Company, the Philadelphia Coal Company, the Barclay Railroad and Coal Company and the Empire Coal Company. He was an incorporator of The Equitable Insurance, Life Insurance, Annuity and Trust Company, and of the United States Insurance, Annuity and Trust Company. Johnson was also a trustee of the Union Academy of Philadelphia, which was chartered in 1851. He became a member of the Franklin Institute in 1825 and a life member in 1835. He was a member of both the Typographical Society of Philadelphia and of the Historical Society of Pennsylvania. In 1852, he was elected a member of the Philadelphia Society for the Establishment and Support of Charity Schools.

== Family ==
Johnson first married Sarah Bacon Murray, daughter of James Murray and Jane Doane of Philadelphia, on 3 May 1825. She died on 21 August 1834, one month after the death of their second child. Their one surviving child, Sarah Murray Johnson, was born on 27 March 1826.

Lawrence Johnson's second wife was Mary Winder, daughter of Aaron Winder and Sarah Van Horn, of Bucks County, Pennsylvania. They were married on 29 May 1837 by the Mayor of Philadelphia, John Swift. They lived on Pine Street in Philadelphia. In 1851, Johnson purchased "Lansdowne", a farm and country estate on Neshaminy Creek in Bristol Township, Bucks County, Pennsylvania, where he lived in the summer. The property remained in the family long after his death. Lawrence and Mary Winder Johnson had ten children:

- Edward Winder Johnson, born 12 April 1838, never married. Union veteran of the Civil War.
- Anna Rebecca Johnson, born 15 December 1839, married Theodore Hoe Mead on 3 December 1863.
- Mary Ella Johnson, born 22 September 1841, married James Cheston Morris on 11 January 1870.
- Caroline Fletcher Johnson, born 10 July 1843, married Anthony Taylor on 21 February 1871.
- Howard Lawrence Johnson, born 31 October 1845, married Mary Evangeline Bradley on 7 May 1876.
- Russell Hampden Johnson, born 15 September 1847, married Grace Harriet Price on 13 December 1877.
- Lawrence Johnson, born 28 September 1849, married Louisa Philler Gaw.
- Walter Richards Johnson, born 24 August 1851, married Mary Rebecca Winder on 31 October 1876.
- Robert Winder Johnson, born 7 May 1854, married Rosalie Morris on 10 November 1887.
- Alfred Clayton Johnson, born 17 September 1856, married Countess Toni von Baudissin, 21 July 1888.

Lawrence Johnson was "stricken with apoplexy and paralysis" while at a business meeting in Philadelphia, on 24 April 1860. He was taken home but died on 26 April 1860. He was buried in Woodlands Cemetery, Philadelphia, until a vault and monument were constructed in Mount Vernon Cemetery. On 9 October 1905, his body, with those of other members of the family, was removed to St Thomas' Episcopal Churchyard, Whitemarsh, Montgomery County, Pennsylvania.

== See also ==
- Typographic unit
- Binny & Ronaldson
