= Double canon =

Double canon may refer to:

- Double canon in music, where it refers to a canon with two simultaneous themes
- Double canon in French typography, where it refers to 56-point type
