= Arnold Pannartz and Konrad Sweynheim =

German printers active in Italy, 1400s, sometime partners

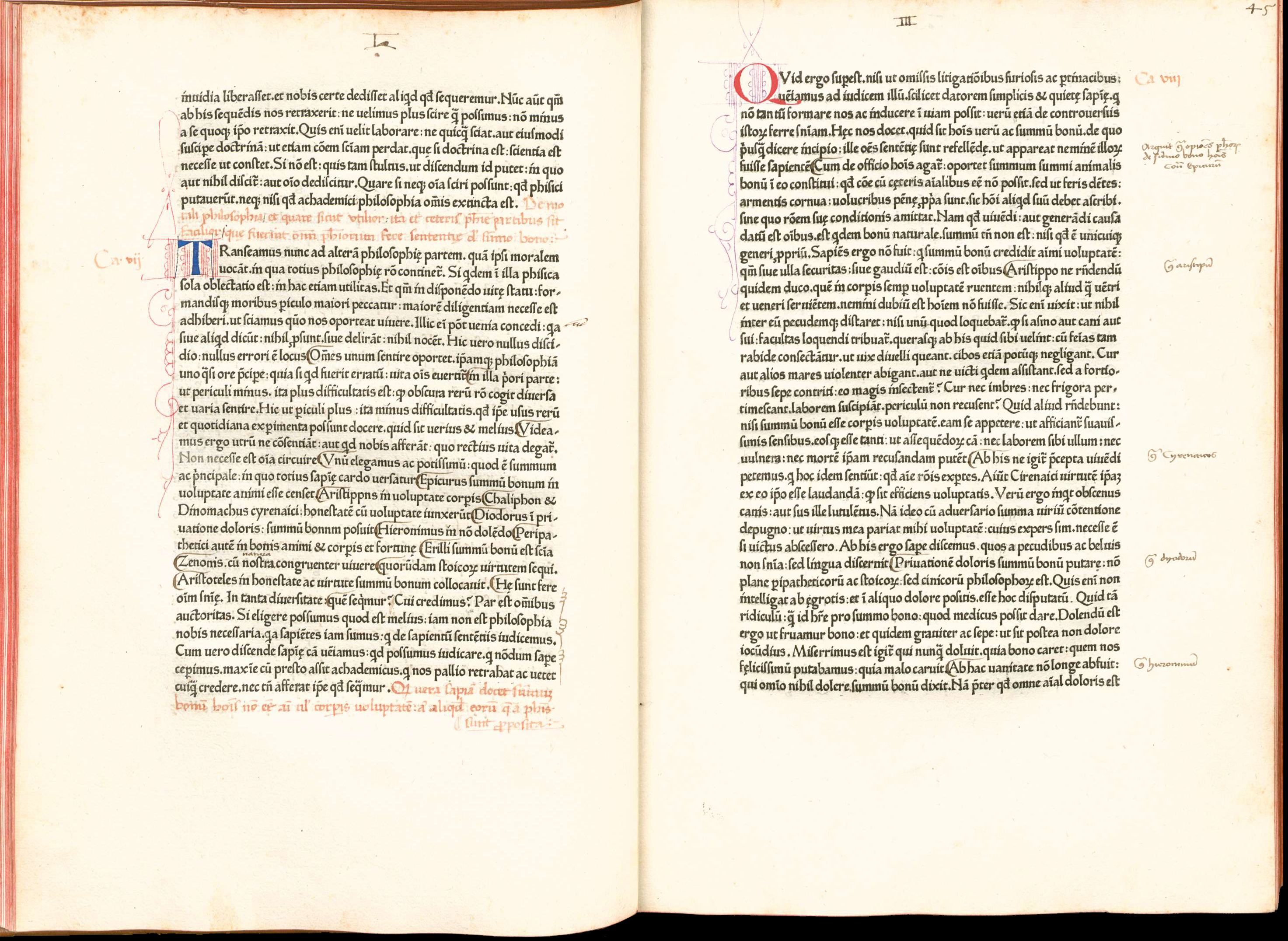
"De divinis institutionibus" by Lactantius; printed by Pannartz and Sweynheim in 1465, copy of the Bayerische Staatsbibliothek

Arnold Pannartz and Conrad Sweynheym were two printers of the 15th century, associated with Johannes Gutenberg and the use of his invention, the mechanical movable-type printing press.

== Backgrounds ==
Arnold Pannartz was, perhaps, a native of Prague, and Conrad Sweynheym of Eltville near Mainz. Gottfried Zedler believed (Gutenberg-Forschungen, 1901) that Sweynheym worked at Eltville with Johannes Gutenberg in 1461–1464. Whether Pannartz had been connected with Sweynheym in Germany is not known. It is certain that the two brought Gutenberg's invention, the mechanical movable-type printing press, to Italy. Pannartz died about 1476, Sweynheym in 1477.

== Printing work ==
The Benedictine Abbey of Saint Scholastica in Subiaco (in present-day Lazio) was the cradle of Italian printing. Probably Cardinal Giovanni Turrecremata, who was Abbot in commendam of Subiaco, summoned the two printers there; they came in 1464. The first book that the Subiaco Press produced was a Donatus; it has not, however, been preserved. The first book printed in Italy that is extant is a Cicero, De oratore, which Pannartz and Sweynheim completed before 30 September 1465. There followed Lactantius, De divinis institutionibus, in October, 1465, and Augustine's De civitate Dei (1467). These four impressions from Subiaco are of particular importance, because they abandon the blackletter of the early German books: Italian readers demanded Roman characters. Pannartz and Sweynheym, however, did not produce a pure but only a "half Roman" type with blackletter-like characteristics.

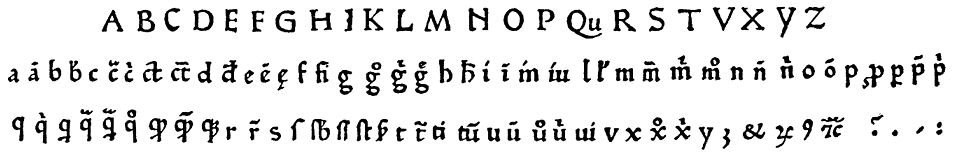
Specimen (c. 1465) of a typeface by Pannartz and Sweinheim - an early example of a semi-Roman type

In 1467, the two printers left Subiaco and settled at Rome, where the brothers Pietro and Francesco Massimo placed a house at their disposal. That same year they published an edition of Cicero's letters that gave its name to the typographic unit of measurement named cicero, Continental Europe's equivalent of the pica typographic unit. Their editorial director was Giovanni Andrea Bussi, at that time Bishop of Aleria in Corsica.

The works they printed are given in two lists of their publications, issued in 1470 and 1472. Up to 1472, they had published twenty-eight theological and classical volumes, namely, the Bible, Lactantius, Cyprian, Augustine, Jerome, Leo the Great, Thomas Aquinas, Cicero, Apuleius, Gellius, Virgil, Livy, Strabo, Pliny, Quintilian, Suetonius, Ovid, etc., in editions varying from 275 to 300 copies each – in all, 12,475 volumes.

== Church backing ==
The pair shared the fate of their master, Gutenberg; they could not sell their books, and fell into want. The Catholic Church took an interest in the expansion of printing during that time. In 1472, Pannartz and Sweynheim applied to Pope Sixtus IV for Church benefices. This application establishes that were ecclesiastics: Pannartz of Cologne and Sweynheym of Mainz. Sixtus had a reversion drawn up for them, a proof of his great interest in printing. In 1474, Sweynheym was made a canon at St. Victor at Mainz. It is not known whether Pannartz also obtained benefice. Perhaps the pope also aided them; at any rate, they printed eighteen more works in 1472 and 1473.

After this they separated. Pannartz printed by himself thirteen further volumes. Sweynheym took up engraving on metal and executed the fine maps for the Cosmography of Ptolemy, the first work of this kind, but died before he had finished his task.

== See also ==
- Cicero (typography)
- Books in Italy
