= Great primer =

Font size of 18 points

Great primer is a large font size (18 points) that was used in the printing of English Bibles and other large-format books, leading to its other name of Bible Text. The largest size ever (or at least up to about 1843) used in England for printing books, it was several sizes larger than English (14 pt) but smaller than paragon (20 pt). It was known in Italian as testo. Other synonyms include Double Bourgeois, 18-point, Gros Romain (French), Text (Dutch) and Tertia (German).

Great-primer size fonts have been in use since William Caxton, around 1488.

== See also ==
- Traditional point-size names
