= Pitch (typewriter) =

Number of glyphs in 1 inch of text

Pitch is the number of (monospaced) letters, numbers and spaces in one inch (25.4 mm) of running text, that is, characters per inch (cpi), measured horizontally.

== Overview ==
The pitch was most often used as a measurement of the size of typewriter fonts as well as those of impact printers used with computers.

The most widespread fonts in typewriters are 10 and 12 pitch, called Pica and Elite, (Note: Pica, the typewriter font, should not be confused with pica (unit), a unit equal to 1/6 of an inch or twelve points, usually measured vertically) respectively. Both fonts have the same x-height, yielding six lines per vertical inch. There may be other font styles with various width: condensed or compressed (17–20 cpi), italic or bold (10 pitch), enlarged (5–8 cpi), and so on.

== See also ==
- Courier (typeface) – Monospaced slab serif typeface
- Letter-spacing – Physical spacing of characters in text
- Proportional spacing – A proportional typeface contains glyphs of varying widths, while a monospaced (non-proportional or fixed-width) typeface uses a single standard width for all glyphs in the font. Consequently, the pitch of a proportionally spaced font is undefined.
- Traditional point-size names
