= Francesco Torniello =

Francesco Torniello da Novara
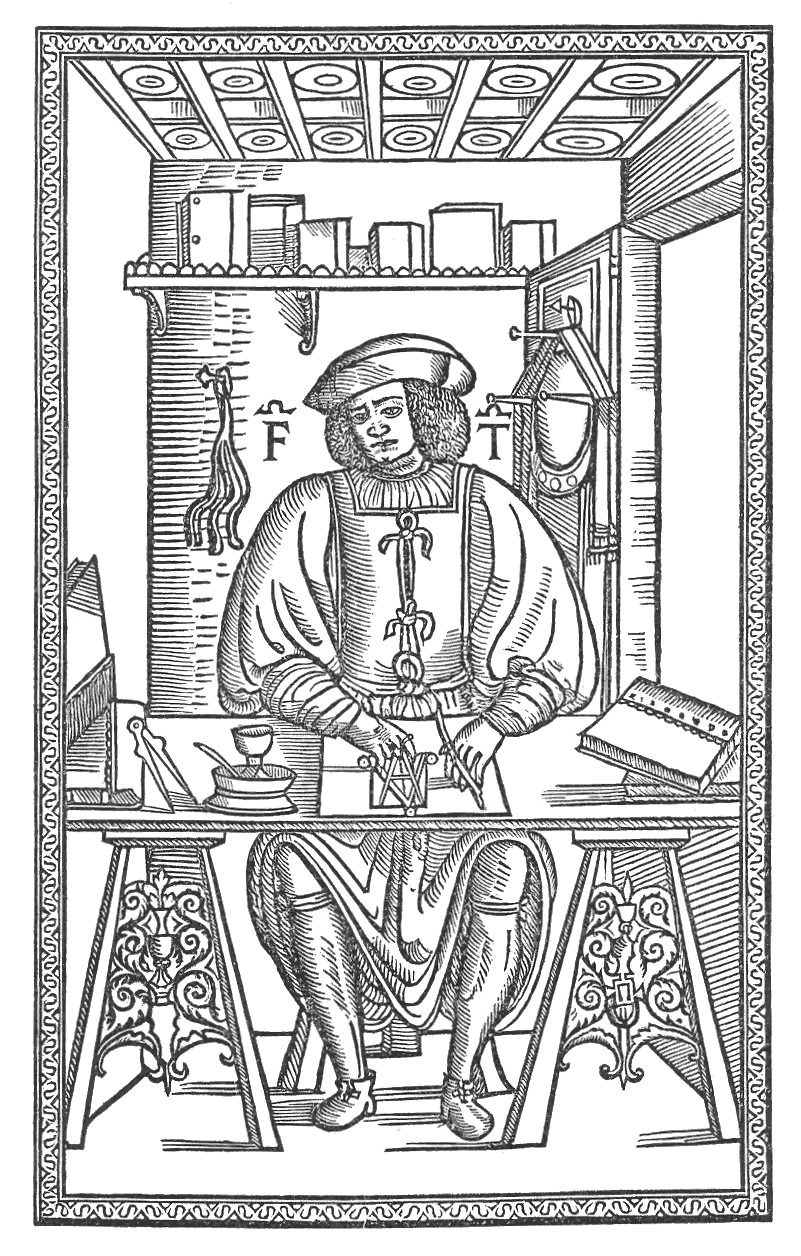
- Francesco Torniello da Novara in 1517
- Born: 1490; Barengo, Duchy of Milan
- Died: 1589 (aged 98–99); Treviglio, Duchy of Milan
- Occupations: typographer, geometrician, writer, friar

Francesco Torniello da Novara (c. 1490 – 1589) was a Milanese typographer, writer and Franciscan friar who became known for applying geometric specifications to Latin capital letters fonts.

== Life ==
Torniello was born between 1488 and 1491 in Barengo, which was part of the Duchy of Milan. He came from a noble family of the area. He studied geometry and mathematics. In 1519 he joined the Order of Friars Minor as a preacher. In 1525 Torniello and his brother, Giovanni Antonio gained Milanese citizenship. He died in 1589 in the monastery of Treviglio in the Duchy of Milan.

== Works ==
Torniello's works were focused on adopting the Latin alphabet inscriptions as original as possible, while simultaneously improving their geometric conditions. His works were influenced by Luca Pacioli's Divine Proportione (Divine Proportions) and Sigismondo Fanti. These fonts were not then designed for usage in the printing press, but as a model for artistic inscriptions. Torniello designed a 18X18 grid which served as a coordinate system for his geometrical fonts, which were designed for printing press usage. In his work Opera del modo de fare le littere maiuscole antique, which was printed in 1517, Torniello enriched, calligraphically and geometrically, previously-existing fonts. Geometrical conditions were added to the letters "M", "R", "S" and "T". The letters "S" and "T" were also enriched calligraphically. In order to broaden the usage of his fonts in non-Latin texts Torniello added the letter "Z". He also was the first typographer to define the point as unit of measurement in typography.

== Writings ==
- Opera del modo de fare le littere maiuscole antique, 1517, Milan.

Only four copies of the book exist today: one is located in Seville, one in Milan and two in Cambridge.

== See also ==
Giovanni Battista Verini
