= St. Thomas' Church, Whitemarsh =

Coordinates: 40.12201°N 75.21708°W

St. Thomas' Church, Whitemarsh is an Episcopal church located at the juncture of Bethlehem Pike, Skippack Pike, and Church Road in Whitemarsh Township, Pennsylvania. The church is part of the Episcopal Diocese of Pennsylvania. The church reported 1,425 members in 2015 and 1,287 members in 2025. Plate and pledge income reported for the congregation in 2025 was $1,303,040. Average Sunday attendance (ASA) in 2025 was 180 persons. This was a relative decrease from ASA of 295 persons reported in 2019.

== History ==
One of the oldest Episcopal churches in the United States, St. Thomas' Church was founded in 1698. The Pennsylvania guide, compiled by the Writers' Program of the Works Progress Administration in 1940, described St. Thomas' Church as a "simple, dignified, red stone edifice in English Gothic style," noting that

A crenellated [sic] tower rises from the steep slate roof. Three churches have occupied this site since the first log structure was built in 1698; the present one was begun in 1868. During the Revolution the church was occupied first by American, then by Hessian, and finally by British troops. It is said that tombstones in the adjoining graveyard were used by soldiers for cooking ranges and for target practice. Older headstones have disintegrated and many graves are unmarked. Some of the stones bear macabre inscriptions, one of which reads: 'Life is a cheat and always shows it. I thought so once, and now I know it.'

— Federal Writers' Project, "Part III: Tours", Pennsylvania: A Guide to the Keystone State (1940)

== Notable burials ==
- Francis Beverly Biddle (1886-1968) - Attorney General of the United States during World War II
- Joseph Sill Clark, Jr. (1901-1990) - U.S. Senator from Pennsylvania and Mayor of Philadelphia
- Fitz Eugene Dixon, Jr. (1923-2006) - owner of Philadelphia 76ers, Phillies, Flyers and Wings
- Morton Fetterolf, Jr. (1912-1997) - Pennsylvania State Representative and State Senator
- Courtlandt Sherrington Gross (1904-1982) - Aviation pioneer and executive at Lockheed Martin Corporation
- Lawrence Johnson (1801-1860) - printing stereotyper and type-founder
