= Line (unit) =

English unit of length

The line (abbreviated L or l or ‴ or lin.) was a small English unit of length, variously reckoned as 1/10, 1/12, 1/16, or 1/40 of an inch. (Note: 2.54, 2.12, 1.59, 0.64 mm, rounded to two decimal places.) It was not included among the units defined in the Weights and Measures Act 1824, which established the British Imperial units of measurement system.

== Size ==
The line was not recognized by any statute of the English Parliament but was usually understood as 1/4 of a barleycorn, (which itself was recognized by statute as 1/3 of an inch) making it 1/12 of an inch, and 1/144 of a foot. The line was eventually decimalized as 1/10 of an inch, without recourse to barleycorns. (Note: Jefferson, republished by Niles.)

The US button trade uses the same or a similar term but defined as one-fortieth of the US-customary inch (making a button-maker's line equal to 0.635 mm (0.0250 in)).

== In use ==
Botanists formerly used the unit (usually as 1/12 inch) to measure the size of plant parts. Linnaeus's Philosophia botanica (1751) includes the Linea in its summary of units of measurements, defining it as Linea una Mensurae parisinae [lit. 'One line of the Parisian measure']; Stearns gives its length as 2.25 mm (0.089 in). Even after metrication, British botanists continued to employ tools with gradations marked as linea (lines); the British line is approximately 2.1 mm (0.083 in) and the Paris line approximately 2.3 mm (0.091 in).

Entomologists in the UK and other European countries in the 1800s used lines as a unit of measurement for insects, at least for the relatively large mantids and phasmids. Examples include Westwood, in the UK, and de Haan in the Netherlands.

Gunsmiths and armament companies also employed the 1/10-inch line (the "decimal line"), in part owing to the importance of the German and Russian arms industries. These are now given in terms of millimeters, but the seemingly arbitrary 7.62 mm (0.30 in) caliber was originally understood as a 3-line caliber (as with the 1891 Mosin–Nagant rifle). The 12.7 mm (0.50 in) caliber used by the M2 Browning machine gun was similarly a 5-line caliber.

== Other 'line' units ==
Other similar small units called lines include:

- The Russian liniya (ли́ния), 1/10 of the diuym, which had been set precisely equal to an English inch by Peter the Great
- The French ligne or "Paris line", 1/12 of the French inch (French: pouce), 2.256 mm and about 1.06 L.
- The Portuguese linha, 1/12 of the Portuguese inch or 12 "points" (pontos) or 2.29 mm
- The German linie was usually 1/12 of the German inch but sometimes also 1/10 German inch
- The Vienna line, 1/12 of a Vienna inch.

== See also ==
- List of non-coherent units of measurement
