= Ligne =

Unit of length

- Unit system: French
- Unit of: length

Conversions
1 ligne in ...	... is equal to ...
- French units: 12 Truchet point 1/12 pouce
- metric (SI) units: 2.2558 mm
- imperial/US units: 0.08881 in

The ligne (pronounced [liɲ]), or line or Paris line, is a historic unit of length used in France and elsewhere prior to the adoption of the metric system in the late 18th century, and used in various sciences after that time. The loi du 19 frimaire an VIII (Law of 10 December 1799) states that one metre is equal to exactly 443.296 French lines.

It is vestigially retained today by French and Swiss watchmakers to measure the size of watch casings, (Note: Par tradition ancestrale, les horlogers n’utilisent pas le millimètre mais la ligne pour désigner le diamètre d'encageage d'un mouvement. [By ancestral tradition, watchmakers do not use the millimeter but the line to designate the casing diameter of a movement]) in button making and in ribbon manufacture.

== Current use ==
=== Watchmaking ===
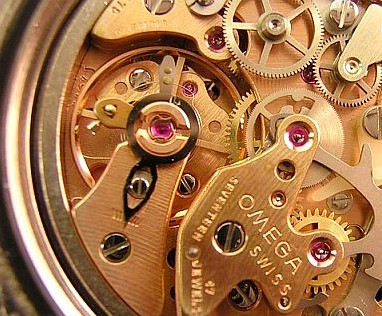
The ligne is still used by French and Swiss watchmakers

There are 12 lignes to one Paris inch (pouce). The standardized conversion for a ligne is 2.2558291 mm (1 mm = 0.443296 ligne), and it is abbreviated with the letter L or represented by the triple prime, ‴. One ligne is the equivalent of 0.0888 international inch.

This is comparable in size to the British measurement called "line" (one-twelfth of an English inch), used prior to 1824. (The French inch at that time was slightly larger than the English one, but the system of 12 inches to a foot and 12 lines to an inch was the same in both cases.)

=== Hatmaking ===
Ligne is used in measuring the width of ribbons in men's hat bands, at 11.26 per international inch.

== Button making ==
The button trade uses the term ligne (sometimes "line"), but with a substantially different definition: 1/40 inch (0.635 mm).

== See also ==
- Line (unit) – English unit of length
- Traditional French units of measurement – French units of measurement before 1789
- Horology – Art or science of measuring time
