= Traditional point-size names =

Names used in printing

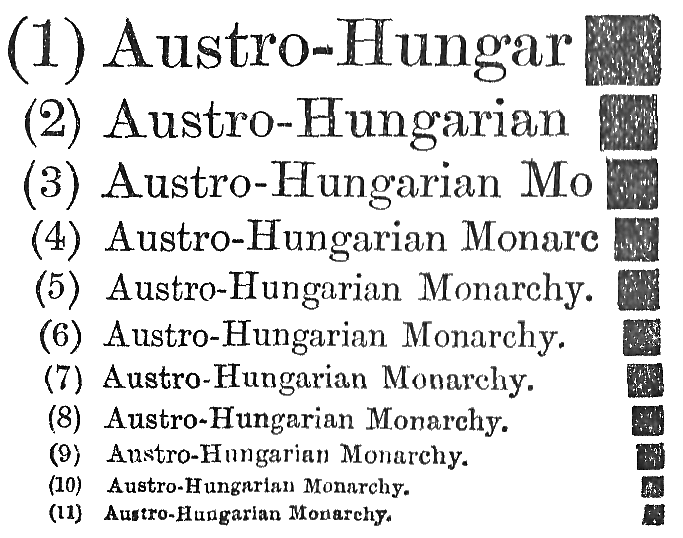
Example of type sizes used in the books and newspapers: (1) Great Primer (18 pt, 6.35 mm), (2) English (14 pt, ≈4.939 mm), (3) Pica (12 pt, ≈4.233 mm), (4) Small Pica (11 pt, ≈3.881 mm), (5) Long Primer (10 pt, ≈3.528 mm), (6) Bourgeois (9 pt, 3.175 mm), (7) Brevier (8 pt, ≈2.822 mm), (8) Minion (7 pt, ≈2.469 mm), (9) Nonpareil (6 pt, ≈2.117 mm), (10) Pearl (5 pt, ≈1.764 mm) and (11) Diamond (4.5 pt, 1.5875 mm).

Fonts originally consisted of a set of moveable type letterpunches purchased from a type foundry. As early as 1600, the sizes of these types—their "bodies"—acquired traditional names in English, French, German, and Dutch, usually from their principal early uses. These names were used relative to the others and their exact length would vary over time, from country to country, and from foundry to foundry. For example, "agate" and "ruby" used to be a single size "agate ruby" of about 5 points; metal type known as "agate" later ranged from 5 to 5.8 points. The sizes were gradually standardized as described above. Modern Chinese typography uses the following names in general preference to stating the number of points. In ambiguous contexts, the word hào (t 號, s 号, lit. "number") is added to the end of the size name to clarify the meaning.

Note that the Chinese font sizes use American points; the Continental systems traditionally used the Fournier or Didot points. The Fournier points, being smaller than Didot's, were associated with the names of the Didot type closest in size rather than identical in number of points.

== Comparison table ==
Point	American system			Continental system				Chinese system		
Point	Metric size	American	British	Metric size	French	German	Dutch	Character	Pinyin	Meaning
1	≈ 0.353 mm	American (Note: The existence of such small bodies was only notional in the age of metal type.)		≈ 0.376 mm		Achtelpetit	Achtste petit			
1 1/2	≈ 0.529 mm	German		≈ 0.564 mm		Achtelcicero	Achtste cicero			
2	≈ 0.706 mm	Saxon		≈ 0.752 mm		Non Plus Ultra; Viertelpetit	Non plus ultra Vierde petit			
2 1/2	≈ 0.882 mm	Norse		≈ 0.940 mm	Microscopique	Microscopique	Microscoop; Microscopie			
3	≈ 1.058 mm	Excelsior (Note: Note that the American name for 3-point type was initially "Brilliant" and the English name was initially "Excelsior". The American "Excelsior", meanwhile, was originally 4-point type. The situation subsequently changed.)	Minikin	≈ 1.13 mm	Diamant	Brillant; Viertelcicero	Kwart cicero			
3 1/2	≈ 1.235 mm	Ruby; Brilliant								
4	≈ 1.411 mm	Brilliant		≈ 1.5 mm	Perle	Diamant; Halbpetit	Robijn; Diamant; Halve petit			
4 1/4	≈ 1.499 mm		Gem							
4 1/2	≈ 1.588 mm	Diamond								
5	≈ 1.764 mm	Pearl		≈ 1.88 mm	Parisienne; Sédanoise	Perl	Parel; Parisienne	八	Bā	"Eight"
5 1/2	≈ 1.940 mm	Agate	Ruby	≈ 2.068 mm				七	Qī	"Seven"
6	≈ 2.117 mm	Nonpareil		≈ 2.25 mm	Nonpareille	Nonpareille	Nonparel; Nonpareil			
6 1/2	≈ 2.293 mm	Minionette	Emerald	≈ 2.44 mm		Insertio	Insertio	小六	Xiǎoliù	"Little Six"
7	≈ 2.469 mm	Minion		≈ 2.65 mm	Mignonne	Kolonel	Kolonel; Mignon			
7 1/2	≈ 2.646 mm			≈ 2.8 mm	Petit-texte			六	Liù	"Six"
8	≈ 2.822 mm	Brevier		≈ 3.0 mm	Gaillarde; Petit-texte	Petit; Jungfer	Petit; Brevier			
9	≈ 3.175 mm	Bourgeois (Note: Pronounced "burjoyce".)		≈ 3.38 mm	Petit-romain; Gaillarde	Bourgeois; Borgis	Borgis; Burgeois	小五	Xiǎowǔ	"Little Five"
10	≈ 3.528 mm	Long Primer		≈ 3.75 mm	Philosophie	Korpus; Garmond	Corpus; Garmond			
10 1/2	≈ 3.704 mm							五	Wǔ	"Five"
11	≈ 3.881 mm	Small Pica		≈ 4.15 mm	Cicéro	Rheinländer; Discendian	Mediaan; Rheinländer			
12	≈ 4.233 mm	Pica		≈ 4.5 mm	St.-Augustin	Cicero	Cicero; Augustijn	小四	Xiǎosì	"Little Four"
14	≈ 4.939 mm	English		≈ 5.25 mm	Gros-texte (Note: The French gros-texte referred indifferently to type sizes between 14 and 16 points.)	Mittel	Grote cicero Grote augustijn Mediaan	四	Sì	"Four"
15	≈ 5.292 mm			≈ 5.64 mm	Gros-texte			小三	Xiǎosān	"Little Three"
16	≈ 5.644 mm	Columbian Exchange		≈ 6.0 mm	Gros-texte	Tertia	Tertia	三	Sān	"Three"
18	≈ 6.350 mm	Great Primer		≈ 6.75 mm	Gros-romain	1 1/2 Cicero	Paragon; Tekst	小二	Xiǎoèr	"Little Two"
20	≈ 7.056 mm	Paragon		≈ 7.5 mm	Petit-parangon	Text; Secunda				
22	≈ 7.761 mm	Double Small Pica		≈ 8.27 mm	Gros-parangon			二	Èr	"Two"
24	≈ 8.467 mm	Double Pica		≈ 9.0 mm	Palestine	Doppelcicero	Dubbele cicero Palestine	小一	Xiǎoyī	"Little One"
26	≈ 9.172 mm							一	Yī	"One"
28	≈ 9.878 mm	Double English		≈ 10.5 mm	Petit-canon	Doppelmittel	Dubbele mediaan			
30	≈ 10.583 mm	Five-line Nonpareil		≈ 11.3 mm						
32	≈ 11.289 mm	Double Columbian		≈ 12.0 mm		Kleine Kanon; Doppeltertia	Dubbele tertia			
36	12.7 mm	Double Great Primer		≈ 13.5 mm	Trismégiste	Kanon; Canon	Kanon	小初	Xiǎochū	"Little Initial"
40	≈ 14.111 mm	Double Paragon		≈ 15.0 mm		Doppeltext; Große Kanon (Note: The German Große Kanon referred indifferently to 40- or 42-point type.)				
42	≈ 14.817 mm	Seven-line Nonpareil		≈ 15.8 mm		Große Kanon	Grote Kanon	初	Chū	"Initial"
44	≈ 15.522 mm	Canon		≈ 16.5 mm	Gros-canon (Note: The French gros-canon referred indifferently to type sizes of 44 or 48 points.)	Missal	Parijs Romein			
48	≈ 16.933 mm	Four-line Pica; French canon	Canon	≈ 18.0 mm	Gros-canon	Kleine Missal	Konkordanz; Kleine missaal			
54	≈ 19.050 mm			≈ 20.3 mm		Missal	Missaal			
56	≈ 19.756 mm			≈ 21.1 mm	Double-canon					
60	≈ 21.167 mm	Five-line pica		≈ 22.5 mm		Große Missal	Sabon			
66	≈ 23.283 mm			≈ 24.8 mm		Große Sabon	Grote sabon			
72	25.4 mm	Six-line pica Inch		≈ 27.1 mm	Double-trismégiste	Sabon; Sechscicero; Kleine Sabon	6 cicero			
84	≈ 29.633 mm	Seven-line pica		≈ 31.5 mm		Siebencicero; Große Sabon	7 cicero			
88	≈ 31.044 mm			≈ 33 mm	Triple-canon					
96	≈ 33.867 mm	Eight-line pica		≈ 36 mm	Grosse-nonpareille	Achtcicero; Real	8 cicero			
100	≈ 35.278 mm			≈ 37.5 mm	Moyenne de fonte					
108	38.1 mm	Nine-line pica		≈ 40.5 mm		Imperial	9 cicero			

== See also ==
- Typographic unit
- Typometer
- Pitch (typewriter)
- Courier (typeface)
- List of typefaces
