= Cicero (typography) =

Unit of measure used in typography

- Unit system: typographic unit
- Unit of: length

Conversions
1 cicero in ...	... is equal to ...
- historical French units: 1/6 in
- typographic units: 1.066 picas
- metric (SI) units: 4.51165812456 mm
- imperial/US units: 0.1776 in

A cicero (/ˈsɪsəroʊ/ SISS-ər-oh) is a unit of measure used in typography in Italy, France and other continental European countries, first used by Pannartz and Sweynheim in 1468 for the edition of Cicero's Epistulae ad Familiares. The font size thus acquired the name cicero.

It is 1/6 of the historical French inch, and is divided into 12 points, known in English as French points or Didot points. The unit of the cicero is similar to an English pica, although the French inch was slightly larger than the English inch. There are about 1.066 picas to a cicero; a pica is 4.23333333 mm and a cicero is 4.51165812456 mm.

Cicero (and the points derived from cicero) was used in the early days of typography in continental Europe. In modern times, all computers use pica (and the points derived from pica) as font size measurement – alongside millimeters in countries using the metric system – for line length and paper size measurement.
