= Hermann Berthold =

Prussian and German printer (1831–1904)

- Born: August 19, 1831
- Died: December 23, 1904 (aged 73)

August Hermann Berthold (August 19, 1831 – December 23, 1904) was a Prussian and German printer. He founded H. Berthold AG.

== Life ==
Hermann Berthold was born in 1831 in Berlin, the son of a printer. After completing his training as a precision mechanic, Berthold initially worked in Paris at the Imperial French Galvanic Institute. In 1858 he founded the Institute for Galvanoplasty in Berlin. There, copper plates were hardened, electrotyping work for book printing was carried out, and electrotypes were produced.

In 1861, Berthold expanded the institute in cooperation with G. Zechendorf, after which the firm operated under the name Zechendorf and Berthold. The expansion also included a type foundry, a brass rule factory, and a workshop for stereotype production. The partnership, however, lasted only until 1864.

Afterward, Berthold separated from Zechendorf and focused on the production of brass rules, electrotypes, and tools. The institute was thereafter known as H. Berthold Schriftgießerei und Messinglinienfabrik (H. Berthold Type Foundry and Brass Rule Factory). During this period, Berthold improved several printing tools, such as the composing stick through the introduction of a wedge-lever lock, and the galley with a rim made of mahogany. For the manufacture of brass rules, he also developed new tools such as the line-planer, which allowed the thickness of rules to be adjusted with precision.

In 1869, Berthold acquired his own building in Berlin-Kreuzberg and established his business there. His entrepreneurial activities brought him considerable wealth, enabling him in 1883 to commission the construction of Haus Berthold in the fashionable Baltic Sea resort of Heringsdorf. The building, now known as Villa Oechsler, is of art-historical significance due in part to a mosaic by Antonio Salviati.

Until 1878, there was no standardized implementation of the Didot system in Germany, and type heights varied considerably between individual printing houses across Europe. In 1878, Berthold began developing the typometer, which led to the introduction of a standardized system of measurement from 1880 onward. Berthold managed his company until 1888, when A. Selberg succeeded him. In December 1904, Hermann Berthold died at the Schöneberger institution Maison de Santé and was buried at Grunewald Cemetery.

== Achievements ==
Hermann Berthold's most significant accomplishment was the creation of the original standard measure (typometer). Before 1878, there was no unified typographic system. The gradations between type sizes and the height of type, or individual letters, were handled differently from country to country. Some printing houses even maintained their own proprietary type heights. This lack of standardization made the work of suppliers to the printing industry, such as type foundries, considerably more difficult.

With the assistance of Professor Wilhelm Foerster, director of the Normal Calibration Commission, Berthold produced the original standard measure. It was based on the unit of the meter: one meter corresponded to 2,660 typographic points at a temperature of 0 °C. By around 1880, this led to the establishment of the German standard system. The standard type height was set at 62 2/3 typographic points. From then on, type, rules, and other materials could be manufactured in uniform dimensions for all printing operations, allowing for more efficient production.
