= Binny & Ronaldson =

Former type foundry

- Company type: Defunct
- Industry: Type foundry
- Founded: Philadelphia, Pennsylvania, 1796
- Defunct: sold to Lawrence Johnson and George F. Smith in 1883
- Headquarters: Philadelphia, Pennsylvania, United States
- Key people: Archibald Binny, James Ronaldson, founders, Lawrence Johnson, president

Binny & Ronaldson established the first permanent type foundry in the United States. Founded in Philadelphia in 1796 by the Scot Archibald Binny (1762/3–1838) and James Ronaldson (1769–1841).

== History ==
Archibald Binny, of Scotland, emigrated to Philadelphia in the United States in 1795. Binny had been a printer and had some experience in type-founding in Edinburgh. Binny, in partnership with James Ronaldson, a baker who had lost his business in a fire, established a type-foundry in 1796. While operating under the name Binny and Ronaldson, the foundry itself was known as The Philadelphia Type Foundry. The foundry was quite successful and for a time the only type foundry in the United States.

In 1806, Binny & Ronaldson acquired from William Duane some tools and equipment that Benjamin Franklin had purchased from Pierre Simon Fournier in France twenty years earlier. In 1812 the foundry issued the first type specimen book ever produced in the United States. Archibald Binny created a spring lever, which improved the efficiency of type casting. Binny patented three improvements to type-founding: an improved printer's mold, a method of "smoothing or rubbing printers' types", and molds for casting printing types.

Archibald Binny retired from the business in 1815, selling his share of the foundry to his partner, James Ronaldson. Ronaldson continued the business until 1823 when he retired, passing the foundry to his brother Richard Ronaldson.

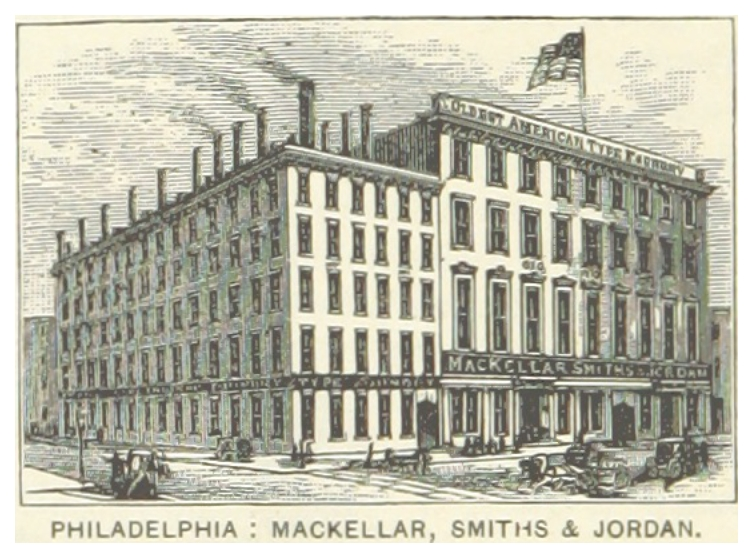
MacKellar, Smiths & Jordan, 1891

In 1833 it was purchased by Lawrence Johnson and George F. Smith. The foundry was combined with Lawrence Johnson’s existing stereotype foundry and greatly expanded and improved. The foundry was owned and operated by Johnson and Smith for ten years until 1843 when Smith retired, although it was known as The Johnson Type Foundry well after Johnson’s death in 1860. Johnson operated the business on his own until 1845 when he brought in three junior partners: Thomas MacKellar, John F. Smith and Richard Smith. Then the Johnson Type Foundry operated under L. Johnson & Company until 1897 when it became MacKellar, Smiths and Jordan, upon the addition of Peter A. Jordan as a partner. In 1892, the firm was incorporated with the American Type Founders’ Company.
