= Paris inch =

Archaic unit of length, about 27 mm

- Unit system: French
- Unit of: length

Conversions
1 paris inch in ...	... is equal to ...
- SI units: 0.027069 m
- imperial/US units: 0.08881 ft 1.0657 in

"The Paris inch is commonly employed as the unit by which to express the focal length of lenses, and it cannot, therefore, be dispensed with"

— The Ophthalmoscope (1864)

The Paris inch or pouce is an archaic unit of length that, among other uses, was common for giving the measurement of lenses. The Paris inch could be subdivided into 12 Paris lines (ligne), and 12 Paris inches made a Paris foot. The abbreviations are the same as for other inch and foot units, i.e.: for Paris foot a single prime symbol ( ′ ), for Paris inch a double prime symbol ( ″ ) and for Paris line a triple prime symbol ( ‴ ),

The Paris inch is longer than the English inch and the Vienna inch, although the Vienna inch was subdivided with a decimal, not 12 lines.

A famous measurement made using the Paris inch is the lens measurement of the first great refractor telescope, the Dorpat Great Refractor, also known as the Fraunhofer 9-inch. The 9-Paris inch diameter lens was made by Joseph von Fraunhofer, which works out to about 24.4 centimetres (9.59 English inches). This lens had the largest aperture of its day for an achromatic lens.

The term for telescopes persisted even in the 20th century, with a telescope listed in the 1909 Sears Roebuck catalog of having 25 lignes diameter aperture, or about 56 mm (5.6 cm). The measurement SPI (Stitches per inch) for leather pricking irons and stitch marking wheels also commonly uses the Paris inch instead of the Imperial inch.

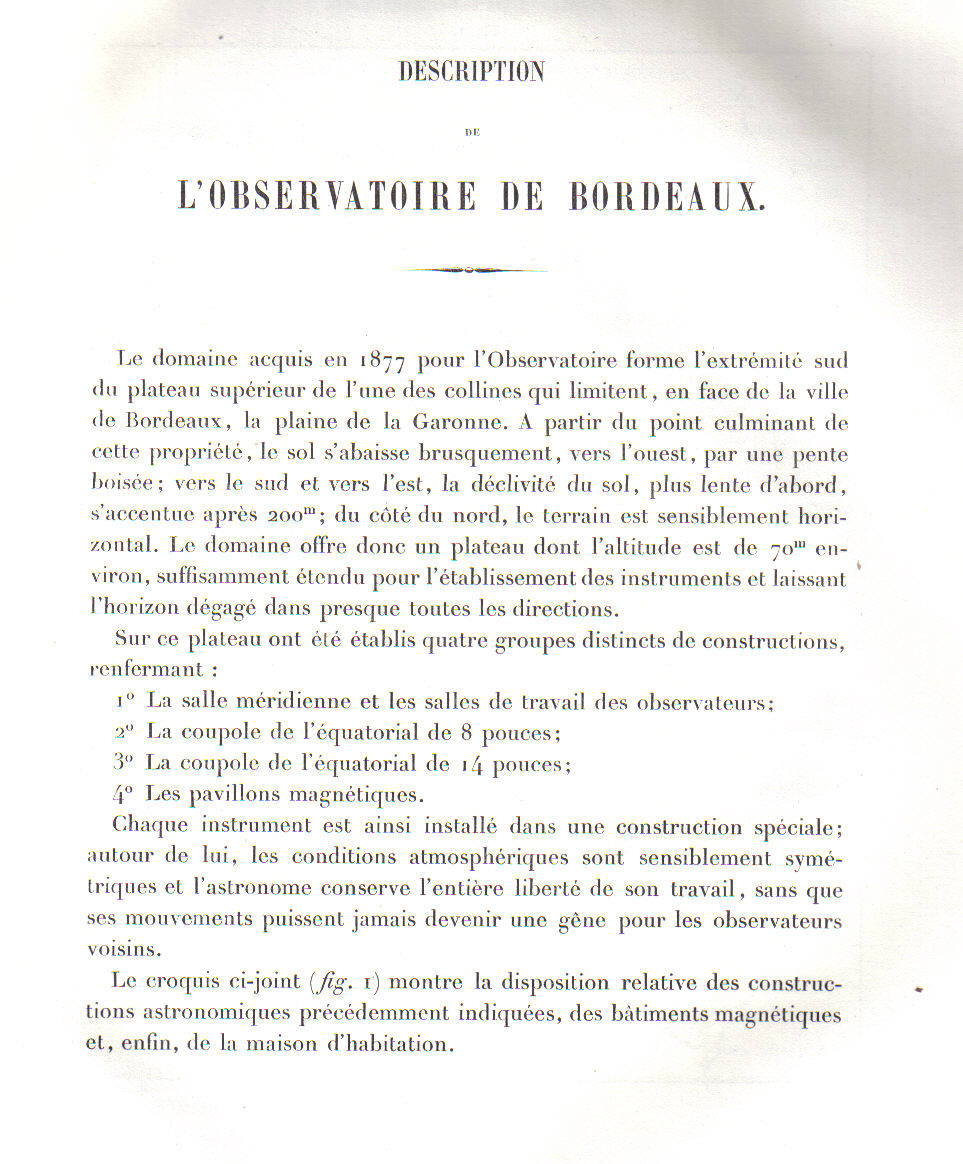
Document for the Bordeaux Observatory (est. 1878) discussing the aperture of the telescopes in units of pouce.

== See also ==
- English & international inch
- Vienna inch
- Traditional French units of measurement
