= Didot family =

Family of French printers and publishers

Didot is a family of French printers, punch-cutters and publishers. Through its achievements and advancements in printing, publishing and typography, the family has lent its name to typographic measurements developed by François-Ambroise Didot and the Didot typeface developed by Firmin Didot. The Didot company of France was ultimately incorporated into the modern CPI printing group.

The Didot family played a significant role in the development of printing over several generations, beginning in the early 18th century in France. François Didot, the progenitor, was a Parisian merchant who founded a bookstore in 1713 and received a printer's charter in 1754, publishing notable works like the "Histoire des voyages." His son, François-Ambroise Didot, succeeded him and made significant contributions to printing technology, including the invention of the Didot point system, a method for sizing typefaces that became standard in Europe.

The family's contributions to the industry continued with Pierre-François Didot, who established a paper factory and made advances in type-founding. The third generation included Pierre Didot and Firmin Didot; Pierre focused on producing sophisticated, collectible books with contributions from contemporary artists, while Firmin pioneered stereotypography and was recognized for his work in type design, contributing to the "Modern" classification of typefaces.

Subsequent generations of the family furthered their legacy. Jules Didot expanded the printing business to Brussels, founding the Royal Printing House, and Ambroise-Firmin Didot took over the family business with his brother, publishing significant works like a new edition of the "Thesaurus Graecae Linguae." The Didots were involved in papermaking and the invention of machinery to improve the printing process.

== First generation ==
=== François Didot ===
François Didot (son of Denis Didot) was a merchant who was born in Paris in 1689 and died in 1757. In 1713 he opened a bookstore called "À la Bible d'or" (which could be translated "The Golden Bible") on the Quai des Grands-Augustins. The celebrated Abbé de Bernis served for a time there as a clerk after leaving the seminary. François Didot was a learned man, and held by his colleagues in such great esteem that he was elected to the dignity of Syndic of the Booksellers' Corporation in 1735. He received his printer's charter from the king in 1754. Among the books he published should be mentioned the Histoire des voyages ("Story of Voyages/Travels") (20 vols., quarto), the first seventeen volumes of which are attributed to the Abbé Prévost. It was remarkable for its typographical perfection, and was adorned with many engravings and maps.

== Second generation ==
=== François-Ambroise Didot ===
François-Ambroise Didot (son of François Didot) was born in 1730 and died in 1804. François-Ambroise Didot inherited the work of his father François. He was appointed printer to the clergy in 1788. Many bibliophiles value the editions known as "D'Artois" (Collection d'ouvrages français, 64 volumes, 1780-84) and "du Dauphin", a collection of French classics in 32 volumes, edited by order of Louis XVI. He also published a Bible. François-Ambroise Didot invented a new printing-press, improved type-founding, and was the first to print on vellum paper.

About 1780 François-Ambroise Didot adapted the point system for sizing typefaces by width, using units of 1/72 of the pre-metric French inch. His "point", later named the didot after him, became the prevailing unit of type measurement throughout continental Europe and its former colonies, including Latin America. In 1973 it was metrically standardized at 0.375 mm for the European Union. (Meanwhile, the English-speaking world adopted a "point" based on 1/72 of the smaller English inch.)

=== Pierre-François Didot ===
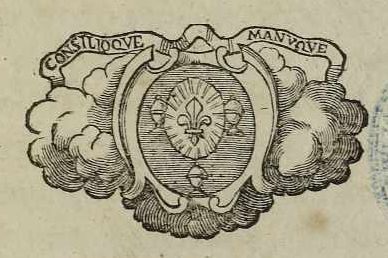
Pierre-François Didot's mark (BEIC)

Pierre-François Didot (son of François Didot) was born in 1732 and died in 1795. Pierre-François Didot founded a paper factory in Essonne and made improvements in type-founding. The most important of his publications are L'Imitation de Jésus-Christ (folio), Télémaque (quarto) and Tableau de L'Empire Ottoman (folio). One of his daughters married Bernardin de Saint-Pierre.

== Third generation ==
=== Pierre Didot ===
Pierre Didot (son of François-Ambroise Didot) was born in 1760 and died in 1853. Pierre Didot and his brother Firmin inherited their father's business in 1798. Pierre started to shift the focus of the press to sophisticated, collectible books. Big books with large margins, exquisite artwork, and exquisite typesetting were all designed by Pierre. In addition, the books frequently had opulent bindings. Pierre hired modern painters to illustrate his works which he then printed the words in a new typeface that his brother had created especially for it. To edit the images, Didot enlisted the services of artist Jacques Louis David. Of his work Virgil, David created five of the images. Pierre Didot was also a poet and translated in verse the fourth book of Georgics, the first books of Horace's Odes, and wrote a number of original poems. Pierre Didot was awarded a gold medal at the exhibition of 1798, for his edition of Virgil. By order of the Government, his presses were established in the Louvre, where they remained during the Consulate. The celebrated Louvre editions are Virgil (1798), Horace (1799), Racine (1801–5), La Fontaine (1802), and Boileau (1816).

=== Firmin Didot ===
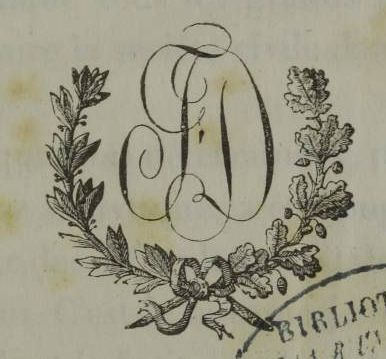
Firmin-Didot's mark (BEIC)

Firmin Didot (son of François-Ambroise Didot) was born in 1764 and died in 1836. Firmin Didot was a pioneer of stereotypography which entirely changed the book trade. Firmin Didot was the first to engrave slips of so-called "English" and round hand-writing. Among the works which issued from his press were Les Ruines de Pompéi, Le Panthéon égyptien of Champollion-Figeac, and Historial du Jongleur, printed in Gothic type, with tail-pieces and vignettes, like the editions of the fifteenth century. In 1827, Firmin Didot gave up business to devote himself to politics and literature. He was a member of the Chamber of Deputies and wrote tragedies (La Reine de Portugal, La Mort d'Annibal) and essays on literary topics.

Along with Giambattista Bodoni of Italy, Firmin Didot is credited with designing and establishing the use of the "Modern" classification of typefaces. The types that Didot used are characterized by extreme contrast in thick strokes and thin strokes, by the use of hairline serifs and by the vertical stress of the letters. Many fonts today are available based on Firmin Didot's typefaces. These include Linotype Didot and HTF Didot .

=== Henri Didot ===
Henri Didot (son of Pierre-François Didot) was born in 1765 and died in 1852. Henri Didot made a name for himself as an engraver, founder, and engine-maker. In 1827, he engraved the microscopic type called 'Non Plus Ultra' that was used for the editions of the "Maximes" of La Rochefoucauld and Horace's works. This type was so small that, to cast it, he had to invent a new mould which he called polyamatype (1819), because it founded one hundred letters at a time. Henri Didot engraved the assignats, the paper money used during the French Revolution.

=== Saint-Léger Didot ===
Saint-Léger Didot (son of Pierre-François Didot) was born in 1767 and died in 1829. Saint-Léger Didot devoted his attention to papermaking in the famous factory of Essonne, where one of his workers, Louis-Nicolas Robert invented a machine to make "endless" paper, and eventually sold the patent to Didot.

== Fourth generation ==
=== Jules Didot ===
Jules Didot (son of Pierre Didot) was born in 1794 and died in 1871. Jules Didot is famous for his invention of round-edged initials, to take the place of the sharp-edged ones. In 1825 he took his printing plant to Brussels and founded the Royal Printing House.

=== Ambroise-Firmin Didot ===
Ambroise-Firmin Didot (son of Firmin Didot) was born 1790 and died in 1876. Ambroise-Firmin Didot first followed a diplomatic career and was for a time attache of the French Embassy at Constantinople. He took advantage of his position to visit the East and Greece, being the first to discover the location of Pergamacum. When his father retired in 1827, he, together with his brother Hyacinthe, took the management of the publishing business. They published the three book series Bibliothèque des auteurs grecs (Scriptorum graecorum bibliotheca), Collection des auteurs latins, and Bibliothèque des auteurs français, which comprised 200 volumes in all. Their greatest work was a new edition of the Thesaurus Graecae Linguae, of Henry Stephens, edited by Jean François Boissonade de Fontarabie, Dindorf, and Hase (9 vols., 1855–59).

Ambroise-Firmin Didot was also involved with the 4th edition of L'Encyclopedie Moderne, 30 vols in total, published in the years 1846–1861. A part was also published as: "Essay sur la Typographie, Extrait du Tome XXVI de l'Encyclopédie moderne, Typographie de Firmin Didot Frères, Imprimereurs de l'Institut de France, Paris, Rue Jacob 56, 1851"

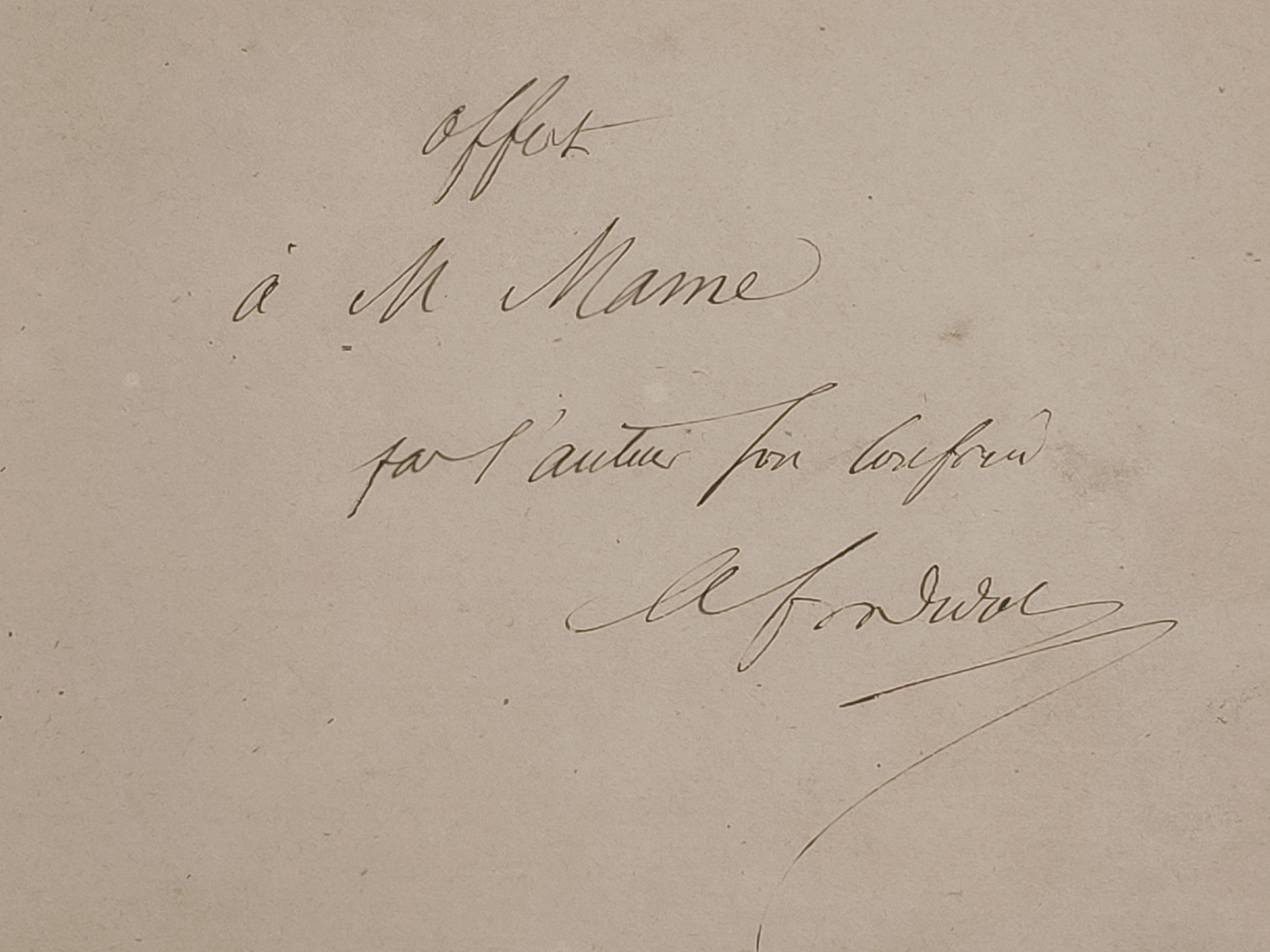
Signature of Ambroise Firmin Didot, found in a copy of "Essai sur la Typographie", 1851

=== Edouard Didot ===
Edouard Didot (son of Saint-Léger Didot) was born in 1797 and died in 1825. Edouard Didot made a translation of Johnson's "Lives of the Poets", which was printed by Jules Didot.
