= Point (typography) =

Measurement unit used in typography

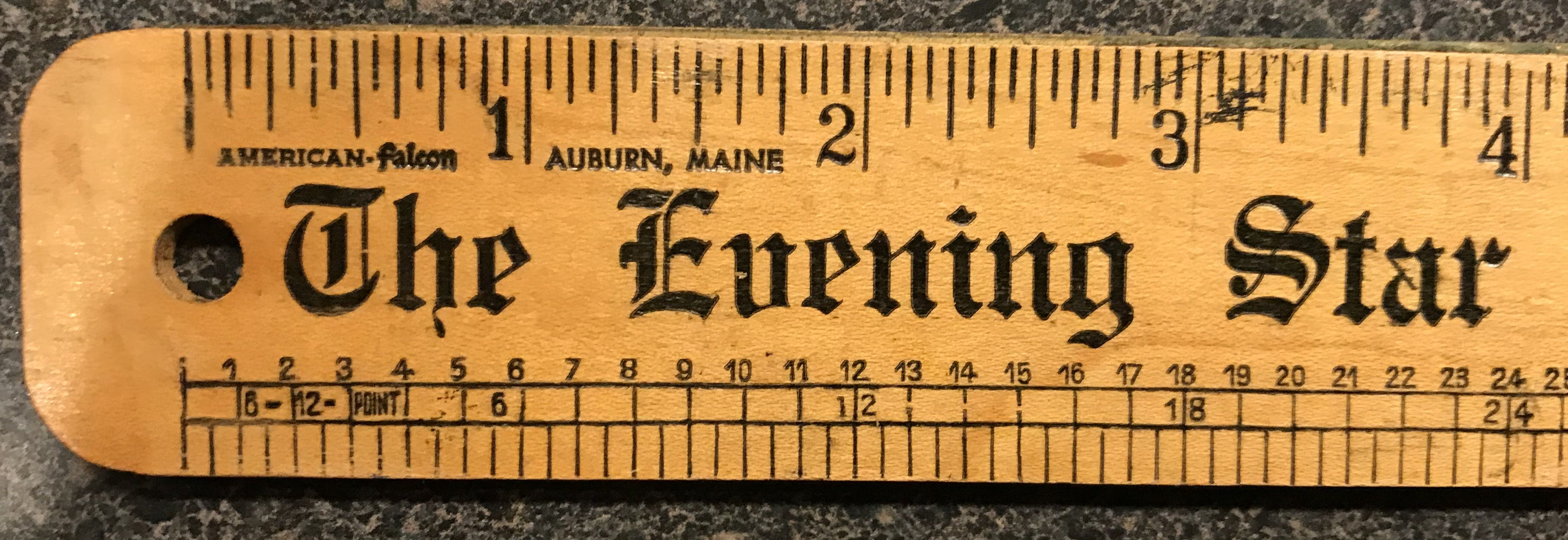
- A ruler showing point scale (on the bottom) and inch scale (on the top)

General information
- Unit system: typographic unit
- Unit of: length

Conversions
1 point in ...	... is equal to ...
- typographic units: 1/12 picas
- imperial/U.S. units: 1/72 in
- metric (SI) units: 0.3528 mm

In typography, the point is the smallest unit of measure. It is used for measuring font size, leading, and other items on a printed page. The size of the point has varied throughout printing's history. Since the 18th century, the size of a point has been between 0.18 and 0.4 millimeters. Following the advent of desktop publishing in the 1980s and 1990s, digital printing has largely supplanted the letterpress printing and has established the desktop publishing (DTP) point as the de facto standard. The DTP point is defined as 1/72 of an inch (or exactly 0.3527̅ mm) and, as with earlier American point sizes, is considered to be 1/12 of a pica.

In metal type, the point size of a font describes the height of the metal body on which that font's characters were cast. In digital type, letters of a computer font are designed around an imaginary space called an "em square". When the point size of a font is specified, the font is scaled so that its em square has a side length of that particular length in points. Although the letters of a font usually fit within the font's em square, there is not necessarily any size relationship between the two, so the point size does not necessarily correspond to any measurement of the size of the letters on the printed page.

== History ==
The point was first established by the Milanese typographer, Francesco Torniella da Novara (c. 1490 – 1589) in his 1517 alphabet, L'Alfabeto. The construction of the alphabet is the first based on logical measurement called "Punto", which corresponds to the ninth part of the height of the letters or the thickness of the principal stroke.

== Notations ==
A measurement in points can be represented in three different ways. For example, 14 points (1 pica plus 2 points) can be written:

- 1P/2p (12 points would be just "1P/ ")—traditional style
- 1p2 (12 points would be just "1p")—format for desktop
- 14pt (12 points would be "12pt" or "1pc" since it is the same as 1 pica)—format used by Cascading Style Sheets defined by the World Wide Web Consortium.

== Varying standards ==
Various point definitions
Name	Year	mm	inch	
≈ 0.350 mm
Fournier	1737	≈ 0.345	0.0135	
American	1886	≈ 0.3515	= 0.013837	
Japanese	1962	= 0.3514	≈ 0.013835	
TeX pt	1982	= 0.3̅5̅1̅4̅5̅9̅8̅0̅	≈ 0.013837	= 1/72.27
PostScript, CSS pt, TeX bp	1984	= 0.3527̅	= 0.0138̅	= 1/72
≈ 0.375 mm
Didot	1783	≈ 0.375972	≈ 0.0148	
Berthold	1878	≈ 0.376	≈ 0.014801	
DIN actual, TeX dd	1964	= 0.376065	≈ 0.014806	
DIN nominal, TeX nd	1984	= 0.375	≈ 0.014764	
Other
Truchet	1694	≈ 0.188	≈ 0.007401	
L'Imprimerie Nationale nominal	1810	= 0.400	≈ 0.015748	
L'Imprimerie Nationale actual	1810	= 0.398 77 mm	≈ 0.0157	
DIN, Japanese, CSS q	1999	= 0.250	≈ 0.009842	

There have been many definitions of a "point" since the advent of typography. Traditional continental European points at about 0.375 mm are usually a bit larger than English points at around 0.350 mm.

=== French points ===
The Truchet point, the first modern typographic point, was 1/12 of a French line (French: ligne). It was invented by the French Catholic priest Sébastien Truchet for the Bignon Commission (1693–1718). (During the metrication of France amid its revolution, a 1799 law declared the meter to be exactly 443.296 French lines long. The Truchet point therefore became equal to 15625/83118 mm or about 0.187986 mm.)

The Fournier point was established by Pierre Simon Fournier in 1737. The system of Fournier was based on a different French foot of about 298 mm (11.7 in). With the usual convention that 1 foot equals 12 inches, 1 inch (French: pouce) was divided into 12 lines (lignes) and 1 line was further divided into 6 typographic points (points typographiques). One Fournier point is about 0.0135 English inches.

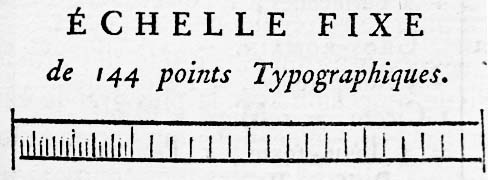
The Fournier scale: two inches in total, divided into four half-inches, the medium intervals are one line (1/12 inch), and the smallest intervals are 1/36 inch; no intervals for the point is given, though

Fournier printed a reference scale of 144 points over two inches; however, it was too rough to accurately measure a single point.

The Fournier point did not achieve lasting popularity, despite being revived by the Monotype Corporation in 1927. It was still a standard in Belgium, in parts of Austria, and in Northern France at the beginning of the 20th century. In Belgium, the Fournier system was used until the 1970s and later. It was called the "mediaan"-system.

The Didot point, established by François-Ambroise Didot in 1783, was an attempt to improve the Fournier system. He did not change the subdivisions (1 inch = 12 subdivisions = 72 points), but defined it strictly in terms of the royal foot, a legal length measure in France: the Didot point is exactly 1/864 of a French foot or 1/72 of a French inch, that is (by 1799) 15625/41559 mm or about 0.375972 mm. Accordingly, one Didot point is exactly two Truchet points.

However, 12 Fournier points turned out to be 11 Didot points, giving a Fournier point of about 0.345 mm; later sources state it as being 0.34875 mm. To avoid confusion between the new and the old sizes, Didot also rejected the traditional names, thus parisienne became corps 5, nonpareille became corps 6, and so on. The Didot system prevailed because the French government demanded printing in Didot measurements.

Approximations were subsequently employed, largely owing to the Didot point's unwieldy conversion to metric units (the divisor of its conversion ratio has the prime factorization of 3×7×1979).

In 1878, Hermann Berthold defined 798 points as being equal to 30 cm, or 2660 points equalling 1 meter: that gives around 0.376 mm to the point. A more precise number, 0.376065 mm, sometimes is given; this is used by TeX as the dd unit. This has become the standard in Germany and Central and Eastern Europe. This size is still mentioned in the technical regulations of the Eurasian Economic Union.

=== Metric points ===
pdfTEX, but not plain TeX nor LaTeX, also supports a new Didot point (nd) at 3/8 mm or 0.375 mm and refers to a not-further-specified 1978 redefinition for it.

The French National Print Office adopted a point of 2/5 mm or 0.400 mm in about 1810 and continues to use this measurement today (though "recalibrated" to 0.39877 mm).

Japanese and German standardization bodies instead opted for a metric typographic base measure of exactly 1/4 mm or 0.250 mm, which is sometimes referred to as the quart in Japan. The symbol Q is used in Japanese after the initial letter of quarter millimeter. Due to demand by Japanese typesetters, CSS adopted Q in 2015.

=== American points ===
The basic unit of measurements in American typography was the pica, usually approximated as one sixth of an inch, but the exact size was not standardized, and various type foundries had been using their own.

During and after the American Revolutionary War, Benjamin Franklin was sent as commissioner (Ambassador) for the United States to France from December 1776 to 1785. While living there he had close contact with the Fournier family, including the father and Pierre Simon Fournier. Franklin wanted to teach his grandson Benjamin Franklin Bache about printing and typefounding, and arranged for him to be trained by Francois Ambroise Didot. Franklin then imported French typefounding equipment to Philadelphia to help Bache set up a type-foundry. Around 1790, Bache published a specimen sheet with some Fournier types. After the death of Franklin, the matrices and the Fournier mould were acquired by Binny and Ronaldson, the first permanent type-foundry in America. Successive mergers and acquisitions in 1833, 1860 and 1897 saw the company eventually become known as MacKellar, Smith & Jordan. The Fournier cicero mould was used by them to cast pica-sized type.

Nelson Hawks proposed, like Fournier, to divide one American inch exactly into six picas, and one pica into 12 points. However, this saw an opposition because the majority of foundries had been using picas less than one sixth of an inch. So in 1886, after some examination of various picas, the Type Founders Association of the United States approved the pica of the L. Johnson & Co. foundry of Philadelphia (the "Johnson pica") as the most established. The Johnson foundry was influential, being America's first and oldest foundry; established as Binny & Ronaldson in 1796, it would go through several names before being the largest of the 23 foundries that would merge in 1892 to form the American Type Founders Co. The official definition of one pica is 0.166044 inches (4.2175 mm), and one point is 0.013837 inches (0.3515 mm). That means 6 picas or 72 points constitute 0.996264 standard inches. A less precise definition is one pica equals 0.166 inches (4.2 mm), and one point 0.01383 inches (0.351 mm). It was also noticed that 83 picas is nearly equal to 35 cm, so the Type Founders Association also suggested using a 35 cm metal rod for measurements, but this was not accepted by every foundry.

This has become known as the American point system. The British foundries accepted this in 1898.

For the TeX computer typesetting system he invented in the 1970s, Donald Knuth declared the size of the point to be exactly 1/72.27 of the inch. This is sometimes known as the TeX point. Since 1 inch is exactly 25.4 mm, it follows that, 1 TeX pt = 1/72.27 in = 0.0̅1̅3̅8̅3̅7̅0̅0̅ in = 0.3̅5̅1̅4̅5̅9̅8̅0̅ mm. This is trivially different from the American point.

=== Old English points ===
Although the English Monotype manuals used 1 pica = 0.1660 inches (4.22 mm), their manuals used on the European continent use another definition. There, 1 pica = 0.1667 in (4.23 mm), the Old English pica. As a consequence all the tables of measurements in the German, Dutch, French, Polish and all other manuals elsewhere on the European continent for the composition caster and the super-caster are different in quite some details. The Monotype wedges used at the European continent are marked with an extra 'E' behind the set-size: for instance: 5-12E, 1331-15E etc. When working with the E-wedges in the larger sizes, the differences will increase even more.

=== Desktop publishing point ===
The desktop publishing point (DTP point) or PostScript point is defined as 1/72 or 0.0138̅ of an inch, making it equivalent to 25.4/72 mm = 0.3527̅ mm. Twelve points make up a pica, and six picas make an inch. The PS documentation only calls this length "unit size" and notes:

The default unit size (1/72 inch) is approximately the same as a “point,” a unit widely used in the printing industry. It is not exactly the same as a point, however; there is no universal definition of a point.

This specification was found in the Xerox Interpress language used for its early digital printers and further developed by John Warnock and Charles Geschke when they created Adobe PostScript. It was adopted by Apple Computer as the standard for the display resolution of the original Macintosh desktop computer and the print resolution for the LaserWriter printer.

In 1996, it was adopted by W3C for Cascading Style Sheets (CSS) where it was later related at a fixed 3:4 ratio to the pixel (e.g. 12 pt and 16 px are the same in CSS) due to a general (but wrong) assumption of 96 pixel-per-inch screens.

=== Resolution-dependent point ===
Since the advent of high-density "Retina" screens with a much higher resolution than the original 72 dots per inch, Apple's programming environment Xcode sizes GUI elements in points that are scaled automatically to a whole number of physical pixels in order to accommodate for screen size, pixel density and typical viewing distance. This Cocoa point pt is equivalent to the pixel px unit in CSS (which has a different unit pt), the density-independent pixel dp on Android and the effective pixel epx or ep in Windows UWP.

== Font sizes ==
In lead typecasting, most font sizes commonly used in printing have conventional names that differ by country, language and the type of points used.

Desktop publishing software and word processors intended for office and personal use often have a list of suggested font sizes in their user interface, but they are not named and usually an arbitrary value can be entered manually. Microsoft Word, for instance, suggests every even size between 8 and 28 points and, additionally, 9, 11, 36, 48 and 72 points (the font sizes 36, 48 and 72 equal 3, 4 and 6 picas respectively). While most software nowadays defaults to DTP points, many allow specifying font size in other units of measure (e.g., inches, millimeters, pixels), especially code-based systems such as TeX and CSS.

== See also ==
- Body height (typography) – Height of the space in which a type element is defined
- Dots per inch (DPI) – Measure of dot density
- Pica (disambiguation)
- Point (disambiguation)
- Traditional point-size names
