= Pica (unit) =

Unit of length used in type design

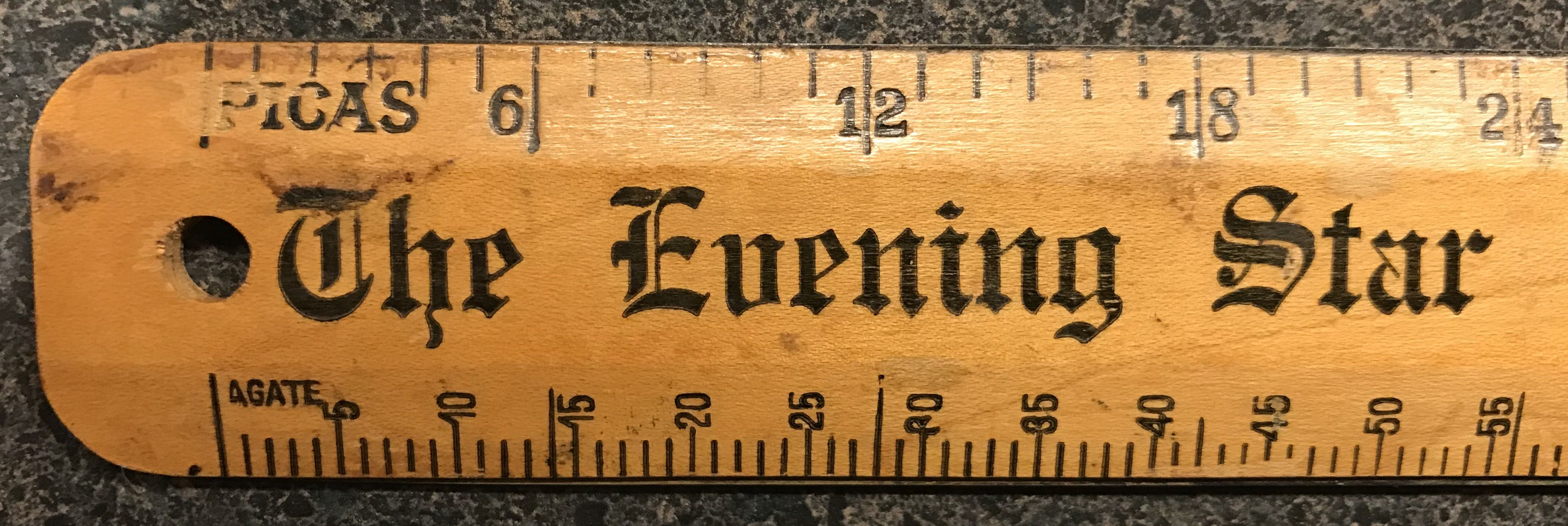
- A ruler showing Pica scale (on the top) and Agate scale (on the bottom)

General information
- Unit system: Typographic unit
- Unit of: Length

Conversions
1 pica in ...	... is equal to ...
- typographic units: 12 points
- imperial/US units: 1/6 in
- metric (SI) units: 4.2333 mm

The pica is a typographic unit of measure that has varied in size historically and by jurisdiction. The modern de facto standard size is exactly 1/6 of an inch or about 4.23 millimetres. One pica is further divided into 12 points.

== Typographic unit ==
In printing, three pica measures are used:

- The French pica of 12 Didot points (also called cicero) generally is: 12 × 0.376 = 4.512 mm (0.1776 in).
- The American pica of 0.16604 in (4.217 mm). It was established by the United States Type Founders' Association in 1886. In TeX one pica is 400/2,409 of an inch.
- The contemporary computer PostScript pica is exactly 1/6 of an inch, i.e. 0.16̅ in or 4.23̅ mm.

Publishing applications such as Adobe InDesign and QuarkXPress represent pica measurements with whole-number picas left of a lower-case p, followed by the points number, for example: 5p6 represents 5 picas and 6 points, or 5 1/2 picas.

Cascading Style Sheets (CSS) defined by the World Wide Web Consortium use pc as the abbreviation for pica (1/6 of an inch), and pt for point (1/72 of an inch).

The pica is also used in measuring the font capacity and is applied in the process of copyfitting. The font length is measured there by the number of characters per pica (cpp). As books are most often printed with proportional fonts, cpp of a given font is usually a fractional number. For example, an 11-point font (like Helvetica) may have 2.4 cpp, thus a 5-inch (30-pica) line of a usual octavo-sized (6×8 in) book page would contain around 72 characters (including spaces).

There have existed copyfitting tables for a number of typefaces, and typefoundries often provided the number of characters per pica for each type in their specimen catalogs. Similar tables exist as well with which one can estimate the number of characters per pica knowing the lower-case alphabet length.

== See also ==
- Pica (disambiguation)
- Pica (type) – Font used by many typewriters, ten-characters-per-inch pitch
- Pitch (typewriter) – Number of glyphs in 1 inch of text (monospaced fonts only)
- Traditional point-size names – Names used in printing, includes a size called pica in US usage
