= Figure space =

Typographical space as wide as a numeral

A figure space or numeric space is a typographic unit equal to the size of a single numerical digit. Its size can fluctuate somewhat depending on which font is being used. This is the preferred space to use in numbers. It has the same width as a digit and keeps the number together for the purpose of line breaking.

== Standard ==
In Unicode it is assigned U+2007 FIGURE SPACE. Its HTML character entity reference is &numsp;.

Baudot code may include a figure space. It is character 23 on the Hughes telegraph typewheel.

== See also ==
- Digit grouping
- Em (typography) – Typographic unit equal to the point size
- En (typography) – Typographic unit equal to half an em
- Figure dash – Dash as wide as a digit
- Non-breaking space – Special character in text processing
- Space (punctuation) – Blank area that separates text
- Thin space – Space character about 1/5 em wide
- Whitespace character – Computer text file character representing blank space
- Word joiner – Character in text processing
