= Dash =

Long horizontal line punctuation mark

—o

Dash
‒	–	—	―
Figure dash	En dash	Em dash	Horizontal bar

In Unicode
- U+2012 ‒ FIGURE DASH; U+2013 – EN DASH; U+2014 — EM DASH; U+2015 ― HORIZONTAL BAR

The dash is a punctuation mark consisting of a long horizontal line. It is similar in appearance to the hyphen but is longer and sometimes higher from the baseline. The most common versions are the en dash –, generally longer than the hyphen but shorter than the minus sign; the em dash —, longer than either the en dash or the minus sign; and the horizontal bar ―, whose length varies across typefaces but tends to be between those of the en and em dashes. (Note: In Cambria and many other typefaces, the length of the horizontal bar is equal to three quarters of an em dash or one and a half times an en dash.)

Typical uses of dashes are to mark a break in a sentence, to set off an explanatory remark—similar to parentheses—or to show spans of time or ranges of values.

The em dash is sometimes used as a leading character to identify the source of a quoted text.

== History ==
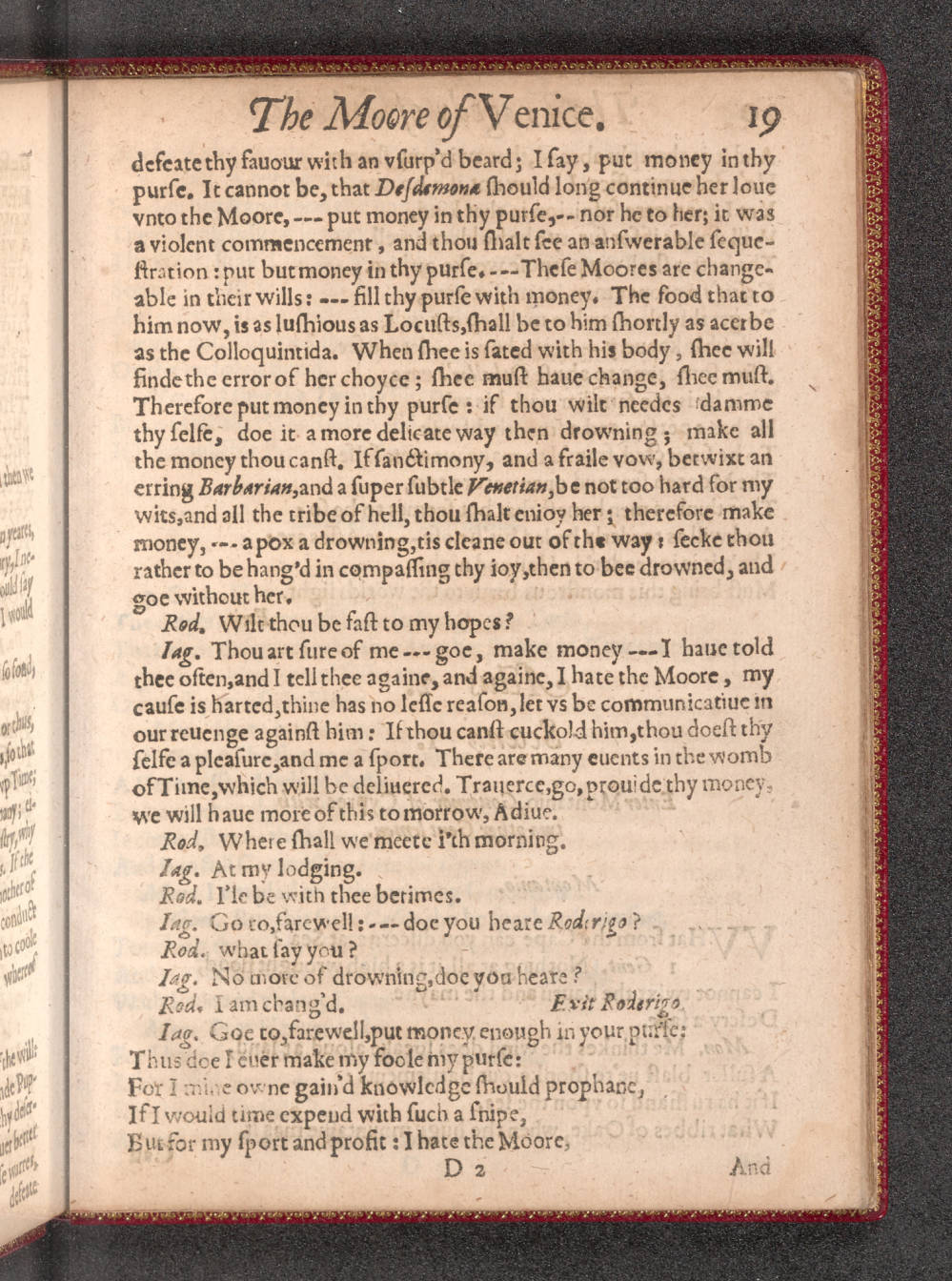
1622 Okes-print of Othello, p. 19. Note use of dashes.

In her book on ellipsis, (Note: Toner uses "ellipsis" as a general term, encompassing such marks as ... ("ellipsis points"), —, and * * * when used in the appropriate function (omitting words). While unusual in the contemporary era, the same nomenclature can be found, for example, in the 1886 Webster's Dictionary.) Ellipsis in English Literature: Signs of Omission, Anne Toner suggests that the first dash that has been found in printed English is from a letter in 1580 and the first use of the dash in English drama dates to a 1588 translation of Terence's Andria, by Maurice Kyffin, where it is composed of a line of hyphens:

In 1588 an edition of Terence's play the Andria was translated into English by Maurice Kyffin and printed by Thomas East. This play seems to contain the earliest markings of [the dash] in English drama [...]. On three occasions, a series of hyphens marks an incomplete utterance. In two of the three instances, one character is interrupted by another. In the second example, the speaker interrupts himself. The printer seems to have considered carefully the appearance of the mark, as the number of hyphens depends on whether they are placed alongside another mark of punctuation.

This was a brilliant innovation. There is no play printed before Kyffin's Andria and listed in W. W. Greg's Bibliography of English Printed Drama that marks unfinished sentences in this way. This is not to say that these were the first [dashes] in English print. There are appearances of the mark earlier in the 1580s. Henry Woudhuysen has identified dashes in letters printed in 1580 and 1585, where in both cases the mark occurs as part of an informal, conversational style.

The popularity of dashes in drama took off after Kyffin's usage; there were three examples in his 1588 translation of Andria, but the 1627 translation of the same play had 29. They appear in William Shakespeare's plays in addition to Ben Jonson's. In the first folio edition of Shakespeare's Henry IV, Part 1, Toner writes, "Hotspur dies on a dash", with his last words cut short.

In 1634, John Barton, an English schoolmaster, wrote in The Art of Rhetorick that "eclipsis" is much used in playbooks "where they are noted thus ---". Toner goes on to explain:

'Eclipses' in the seventeenth century were grammatical and typographical as much as they were astronomical (and in all of these forms they are exactly homophonic). In contemporary guides to rhetoric, the word 'eclipsis' was more common than 'ellipsis' with which it was interchangeable. The OED suggests that 'eclipsis' is perhaps 'confused' with 'ellipsis'. If this was the case, it was an entirely conventional confusion.

(The earliest example given in Ellipsis in English Literature of the mark nowadays called an ellipsis, . . ., is dated to 1710.)

In the early 17th century, in Okes-printed plays of William Shakespeare, dashes are attested that indicate a thinking pause, interruption, mid-speech realization, or change of subject. The dashes are variously longer ⸺ (as in King Lear reprinted 1619) or composed of hyphens --- (as in Othello printed 1622); moreover, the dashes are often, but not always, prefixed by a comma, colon, or semicolon.

Authors have sometimes had a negative view of the dash. In the 18th-century, Jonathan Swift rhymed "dash" with "printed trash", while Henry Fielding chose the name 'Dash' for an unlikeable character in his 1730 play The Author's Farce.

In 1733, in Jonathan Swift's On Poetry, the terms break and dash are attested for ⸺ and — marks:

Blot out, correct, insert, refine,
Enlarge, diminish, interline;
Be mindful, when Invention fails;
To scratch your Head, and bite your Nails.

Your poem finish'd, next your Care
Is needful, to transcribe it fair.
In modern Wit all printed Trash, is
Set off with num'rous Breaks⸺and Dashes—

On the topic of composing a dash out of a series of hyphens vs a single typographical rule, Toner observes:

In expensive folio editions, [...] including the first folios of Jonson and Shakespeare, the dash was evidently the prestige mark above a series of hyphens. While hyphens and dashes continued to be used interchangeably through the eighteenth century, there seems a discernable trend from early on towards using the dash where possible. A single rule or dash replicated more precisely the mark as commonly used in writing, but more importantly setting one mark rather than several would have caused a compositor less trouble. A single mark comes to have a greater aesthetic value, in a period during which there was growing appreciation of the ornamental value, and simply the neatness, of the page.

The dash made of hyphens became less and less common with time until its resurgence with typewriter conventions.

== Types of dash ==
Usage varies both within English and within other languages, but the usual conventions for the most common dashes in printed English text are these:

- An (unspaced) em dash or a spaced en dash can be used to mark a break in a sentence, and a pair can be used to set off a parenthetical phrase. For example:
  Glitter, felt, yarn, and buttons—his kitchen looked as if a clown had exploded.
  A flock of sparrows—some of them juveniles—alighted and sang.
  Glitter, felt, yarn, and buttons – his kitchen looked as if a clown had exploded.
  A flock of sparrows – some of them juveniles – alighted and sang.
- An en dash, but not an em dash, indicates spans or differentiation, where it may replace "and", "to", or "through". For example:
  The French and Indian War (1754–1763) was fought in western Pennsylvania and along the present US–Canada border
  — Edwards, pp. 81–101.
- An em dash or horizontal bar, but not an en dash, is used to set off the source of a direct quotation. For example:
  Seven social sins: politics without principles, wealth without work, pleasure without conscience, knowledge without character, commerce without morality, science without humanity, and worship without sacrifice.
  — Mahatma Gandhi
- A horizontal bar (also called quotation dash) or the em dash, but not the en dash, introduces quoted text.
- In informal contexts, a hyphen (-) is often used as a substitute for an en dash, as is a pair of hyphens (--) for a long dash, because the hyphens symbol is readily available on most keyboards. The autocorrection facility of word-processing software often corrects these to the typographically correct form of dash.

== Figure dash ==
The figure dash ‒ (U+2012 ‒ FIGURE DASH) has the same width as a numerical digit (many computer fonts have digits of equal width). It is used within numbers, such as the phone number 555‒0199, especially in columns so as to maintain alignment. In contrast, the en dash – (U+2013 – EN DASH) is generally used for a range of values.

The minus sign − (U+2212 − MINUS SIGN) glyph is generally set a little higher, so as to be level with the horizontal bar of the plus sign. In informal usage, the hyphen-minus - (U+002D - HYPHEN-MINUS), provided as standard on most keyboards, is often used instead of the figure dash.

In TeX, the standard fonts have no figure dash; however, the digits normally all have the same width as the en dash, so an en dash can be a substitution for the figure dash. In XeLaTeX, one can use \char"2012. The Linux Libertine font also has the figure dash glyph.

== En dash ==
The en dash, en rule, or nut dash – is traditionally half the width of an em dash. In modern fonts, the length of the en dash is not standardized, and the en dash is often more than half the width of the em dash. The widths of en and em dashes have also been specified as being equal to those of the uppercase letters N and M, respectively, and at other times to the widths of the lower-case letters.

=== Usage ===
The three main uses of the en dash are:

- to connect symmetric items, such as the two ends of a range or two competitors or alternatives
- to contrast values or illustrate a relationship between two things
- to compound attributes, where one of the connected items is itself a compound

==== Ranges of values ====
The en dash is commonly used to indicate a closed range of values—a range with clearly defined and finite upper and lower boundaries—roughly signifying what might otherwise be communicated by the word "through" in American English, or "to" in International English. This may include ranges such as those between dates, times, or numbers. Various style guides restrict this range indication style to only parenthetical or tabular matter, requiring "to" or "through" in running text. Preference for hyphen vs. en dash in ranges varies. For example, the APA style (named after the American Psychological Association) uses an en dash in ranges, but the AMA style (named after the American Medical Association) uses a hyphen:

En dash range style (e.g., APA (Note: Other style differences (e.g., APA "p.m." and "pp." vs. AMA "PM" and "pp") are ignored for the purpose of this comparison.))	Hyphen range style (e.g., AMA)	Running text spell-out
June–July 1967	June-July 1967	June and July 1967
1:15–2:15 p.m.	1:15-2:15 PM	1:15 to 2:15 p.m.
For ages 3–5	For ages 3-5	For ages 3 through 5
pp. 38–55	pp 38-55	pages 38 through 55
President Jimmy Carter (1977–81)	President Jimmy Carter (1977-81)	President Jimmy Carter, in office from 1977 to 1981

Some style guides (including the Guide for the Use of the International System of Units (SI) and the AMA Manual of Style) recommend that, when a number range might be misconstrued as subtraction, the word "to" should be used instead of an en dash. For example, "a voltage of 50 V to 100 V" is preferable to using "a voltage of 50–100 V". Relatedly, in ranges that include negative numbers, "to" is used to avoid ambiguity or awkwardness (for example, "temperatures ranged from −18 °C to −34 °C"). It is also considered poor style (best avoided) to use the en dash in place of the words "to" or "and" in phrases that follow the forms from X to Y and between X and Y.

==== Relationships and connections ====
The en dash is used to contrast values or illustrate a relationship between two things. Examples of this usage include:

- Australia beat American Samoa 31–0.
- Radical–Unionist coalition
- Boston–Hartford route
- New York–London flight (however, it may be argued that New York–to–London flight is more appropriate because New York is a single name composed of two valid words [see "Attributive compounds" below]; with a single en dash, the phrase is ambiguous and could mean either Flight from New York to London or New flight from York to London; such ambiguity is assuaged when used mid-sentence, though, because of the capital N in "New" indicating it is a special noun). If dash–hyphen use becomes too unwieldy or difficult to understand, the sentence can be rephrased for clarity and readability; for example, "The flight from New York to London was a pleasant experience".
- Mother–daughter relationship
- The Supreme Court voted 5–4 to uphold the decision.

A distinction is often made between "simple" attributive compounds (written with a hyphen) and other subtypes (written with an en dash). Some sources consider name pairs where the paired elements carry equal weight, as in the Taft–Hartley Act, to be "simple"; others consider an en dash appropriate in instances such as these to represent the parallel relationship, as in the McCain–Feingold bill or Bose–Einstein statistics. However, there is a difference between something named for a parallel/coordinate relationship between two people – for example, Satyendra Nath Bose and Albert Einstein – and something named for a single person who had a compound surname, which may be written with a hyphen or a space but not an en dash – for example, the Lennard-Jones potential [hyphen] is named after one person (John Lennard-Jones), as are Bence Jones proteins and Hughlings Jackson syndrome. Copyeditors use dictionaries (general, medical, biographical, and geographical) to confirm the eponymity (and thus the styling) for specific terms, given that no one can know them all offhand.

When acts of the U.S. Congress are referred to by two of their sponsors, such as the Taft–Hartley Act or McCain–Feingold Act, it is common for news media to use an en dash between the names of the sponsors. However, when an act of the U.S. Congress is officially named using the surnames of the senator and representative who sponsored it, a hyphen is used in the short title; for example, the short title of Public Law 111–203 is the "Dodd-Frank Wall Street Reform and Consumer Protection Act", with a hyphen rather than an en dash between "Dodd" and "Frank".

Preference for an en dash instead of a hyphen in these coordinate/relationship/connection types of terms differs between style guides. For example, The American Heritage Dictionary of the English Language, the AMA Manual of Style, and Dorland's medical reference works use hyphens rather than en dashes in coordinate terms (such as "blood-brain barrier"), in eponyms (such as "Cheyne-Stokes respiration", "Kaplan-Meier method"), and so on. In other styles, such as AP Stylebook or The Chicago Manual of Style, the en dash is used to describe two closely related entities in a formal manner.

==== Attributive compounds ====
In English, the en dash is usually used instead of a hyphen in compound (phrasal) attributives in which one or both elements is itself a compound, especially when the compound element is an open compound, meaning it is not itself hyphenated. This manner of usage may include such examples as:

- The hospital–nursing home connection (the connection between the hospital and the nursing home, not a home connection between the hospital and nursing)
- A nursing home–home care policy (a policy about the nursing home and home care)
- Pre–Civil War era
- Pulitzer Prize–winning novel
- New York–style pizza
- The non–San Francisco part of the world
- The post–World War II era
  - (Compare post-war era, which, if not fully compounded (postwar), takes a hyphen, not an en dash. The difference is that war is not an open compound, whereas World War II is.)
- Trans–New Guinea languages
- The ex–prime minister
- a long–focal length camera
- water ice–based bedrock

The disambiguating value of the en dash in these patterns was illustrated by Strunk and White in The Elements of Style with the following example: When Chattanooga News and Chattanooga Free Press merged, the joint company was inaptly named Chattanooga News-Free Press (using a hyphen), which could be interpreted as meaning that their newspapers were news-free.

An exception to the use of en dashes is usually made when prefixing an already-hyphenated compound; an en dash is generally avoided as a distraction in this case. Examples of this include:

- non-English-speaking air traffic controllers
- semi-labor-intensive industries
- Proto-Indo-European language
- The post-MS-DOS era
- non-government-owned corporations

An en dash can be retained to avoid ambiguity, but whether any ambiguity is plausible is a judgment call. AMA style retains the en dashes in the following examples:

- non–self-governing
- non–English-language journals
- non–group-specific blood
- non–Q-wave myocardial infarction
- non–brain-injured subjects

==== Differing recommendations ====
As discussed above, the en dash is sometimes recommended instead of a hyphen in compound adjectives where neither part of the adjective modifies the other—that is, when each modifies the noun, as in love–hate relationship.

The Chicago Manual of Style (CMOS), however, limits the use of the en dash to two main purposes:

- First, use it to indicate ranges of time, money, or other amounts, or in certain other cases where it replaces the word "to".
- Second, use it in place of a hyphen in a compound adjective when one of the elements of the adjective is an open compound, or when two or more of its elements are compounds, open or hyphenated.

That is, the CMOS favors hyphens in instances where some other guides suggest en dashes, with the 16th edition explaining that "Chicago's sense of the en dash does not extend to between", to rule out its use in "US–Canadian relations".

In these two uses, en dashes normally do not have spaces around them. Some make an exception when they believe avoiding spaces may cause confusion or look odd. For example, compare "12 June – 3 July" with "12 June–3 July". However, other authorities disagree and state there should be no space between an en dash and adjacent text. These authorities would not use a space in, for example, "11:00 a.m.–1:00 p.m." or "July 9–August 17".

==== Parenthetic and other uses at the sentence level ====
En dashes can be used instead of pairs of commas that mark off a nested clause or phrase. They can also be used around parenthetical expressions – such as this one – in a manner similar to the em dashes preferred by some publishers.

The en dash can also signify a rhetorical pause. For example, an opinion piece from The Guardian is entitled:

Who is to blame for the sweltering weather? My kids say it's boomers – and me

In these situations, en dashes must have a single space on each side.

=== Typography ===
==== Spacing ====
In most uses of en dashes, such as when used in indicating ranges, they are typeset closed up to the adjacent words or numbers. Examples include "the 1914–18 war" or "the Dover–Calais crossing". It is only when en dashes are used in setting off parenthetical expressions – such as this one – that they take spaces around them. For more on the choice of em versus en in this context, see En dash versus em dash.

==== Encoding and substitution ====
When an en dash is unavailable in a particular character encoding environment—as in the ASCII character set—there are some conventional substitutions. Often two consecutive hyphens are the substitute.

The en dash is encoded in Unicode as U+2013 (decimal 8211) and represented in HTML by the named character entity &ndash;.

The en dash is sometimes used as a substitute for the minus sign, when the minus sign character is not available since the en dash is usually the same width as a plus sign and is often available when the minus sign is not; see below. For example, the original 8-bit Macintosh Character Set had an en dash, useful for the minus sign, years before Unicode with a dedicated minus sign was available. The hyphen-minus is usually too narrow to make a typographically acceptable minus sign. However, the en dash cannot be used for a minus sign in programming languages because the syntax usually requires a hyphen-minus.

==== Itemization mark ====
Either the en dash or the em dash may be used as a bullet at the start of each item in a bulleted list.

== Em dash ==
The em dash, em rule, or mutton dash — is longer than an en dash. The character is called an em dash because it is one em wide, a length that varies depending on the font size. One em is the same length as the font's height (which is typically measured in points). So in 9-point type, an em dash is nine points wide, while in 24-point type the em dash is 24 points wide. By comparison, the en dash, with its 1 en width, is in most fonts either a half-em wide or the width of an upper-case "N".

The em dash is encoded in Unicode as U+2014 (decimal 8212) and represented in HTML by the named character entity &mdash;.

=== Usage ===
The em dash is used in several ways. It is primarily used in places where a set of parentheses or a colon might otherwise be used. It can also show an abrupt change in thought (or an interruption in speech) or be used where a full stop (period) is too strong and a comma is too weak, similar to that of a semicolon. Em dashes are also used to set off summaries or definitions. Common uses and definitions are cited below with examples.

==== Colon-like use ====
===== Simple equivalence (or near-equivalence) of colon and em dash =====
- Three alkali metals are the usual substituents: sodium, potassium, and lithium.
- Three alkali metals are the usual substituents—sodium, potassium, and lithium.

===== Inversion of the function of a colon =====
- These are the colors of the flag: red, white, and blue.
- Red, white, and blue—these are the colors of the flag.

==== Parenthesis-like use ====
===== Simple equivalence (or near-equivalence) of paired parenthetical marks =====
- Compare parentheses with em dashes:
  - Three alkali metals (sodium, potassium, and lithium) are the usual substituents.
  - Three alkali metals—sodium, potassium, and lithium—are the usual substituents.
- Compare commas, em dashes and parentheses (respectively) when no internal commas intervene:
  - The food, which was delicious, reminded me of home.
  - The food—which was delicious—reminded me of home.
  - The food (which was delicious) reminded me of home.

===== Subtle differences in punctuation =====
It may indicate an interpolation stronger than that demarcated by parentheses, as in the following from Nicholson Baker's The Mezzanine.

- "At that age I once stabbed my best friend, Fred, with a pair of pinking shears in the base of the neck, enraged because he had been given the comprehensive sixty-four-crayon Crayola box—including the gold and silver crayons—and would not let me look closely at the box to see how Crayola had stabilized the built-in crayon sharpener under the tiers of crayons."

==== Interruption of a speaker ====
===== Interruption by someone else =====
- "But I'm trying to explain that I—"
  "I'm aware of your mitigating circumstances, but your negative attitude was excessive."

In a related use, it may visually indicate the shift between speakers when they overlap in speech. For example, the em dash is used this way in Joseph Heller's Catch-22:

- "He was Cain, Ulysses, the Flying Dutchman; he was Lot in Sodom, Deirdre of the Sorrows, Sweeney in the nightingales among trees. He was the miracle ingredient Z-147. He was—
  "Crazy!" Clevinger interrupted, shrieking. "That's what you are! Crazy!"
  "—immense. I'm a real, slam-bang, honest-to-goodness, three-fisted humdinger. I'm a bona fide supraman."

===== Self-interruption =====
- Simple revision of a statement as one's thoughts evolve on the fly:
  - "I believe I shall—no, I'm going to do it."
- Interruption of a statement for dramatic effect:
  - "It's gonna be legen—wait for it—dary!" in How I Met Your Mother.
- Contemplative or emotional trailing off (usually in dialogue or in first person narrative):
  - "I sense something; a presence I've not felt since—" in Star Wars Episode IV: A New Hope.
  - "Get out or else—"

Either an ellipsis or an em dash can indicate aposiopesis, the rhetorical device by which a sentence is stopped short not because of interruption, but because the speaker is too emotional or pensive to continue. Because the ellipsis is the more common choice, an em dash for this purpose may be ambiguous in expository text, as many readers would assume interruption, although it may be used to indicate great emotion in dramatic monologue.

- Long pause:
  - In Early Modern English texts and afterward, em dashes have been used to add long pauses (as noted in Joseph Robertson's 1785 An Essay on Punctuation):
    Lord Cardinal! if thou think'st on heaven's bliss,
    Hold up thy hand, make signal of that hope.—
    He dies, and makes no sign!
    — Shakespeare, Henry VI, Part 2

==== Quotation ====
===== Quotation mark–like use =====
This is a quotation dash. It may be distinct from an em dash in its coding (see horizontal bar). It may be used to indicate turns in a dialogue, in which case each dash starts a paragraph. It replaces other quotation marks and was preferred by authors such as James Joyce:

—O saints above! miss Douce said, sighed above her jumping rose. I wished I hadn't laughed so much. I feel all wet.
—O, miss Douce! miss Kennedy protested. You horrid thing!

===== Attribution of quote source =====
- Inline quotes:
  - A penny saved is a penny earned. —Benjamin Franklin
- Block quotes:

The Walrus and the Carpenter
Were walking close at hand;
They wept like anything to see
Such quantities of sand:
"If this were only cleared away,"
They said, "it would be grand!"

— Lewis Carroll

==== Redaction ====
An em dash may be used to indicate omitted letters in a word redacted to an initial or single letter or to fillet a word, by leaving the start and end letters whilst replacing the middle letters with a dash or dashes (for censorship or simply data anonymization). It may also censor the end letter. In this use, it is sometimes doubled.

- It was alleged that D—— had been threatened with blackmail.

Three em dashes might be used to indicate a completely missing word.

==== Itemization mark ====
Either the en dash or the em dash may be used as a bullet at the start of each item in a bulleted list, but a plain hyphen is more commonly used.

==== Repetition ====
Three em dashes one after another can be used in a footnote, endnote, or another form of bibliographic entry to indicate repetition of the same author's name as that of the previous work, which is similar to the use of id.

=== Typographic details ===
==== Spacing and substitution ====
According to most American sources (such as The Chicago Manual of Style) and some British sources (such as The Oxford Guide to Style), an em dash should always be set closed, meaning it should not be surrounded by spaces. But the practice in some parts of the English-speaking world, including the style recommended by The New York Times Manual of Style and Usage for printed newspapers and the AP Stylebook, sets it open, separating it from its surrounding words by using spaces or hair spaces (U+200A) when it is being used parenthetically. The AP Stylebook rejects the use of the open em dash to set off introductory items in lists.

The "space, en dash, space" sequence is the predominant style in German and French typography. (See En dash versus em dash below.)

In Canada, The Canadian Style: A Guide to Writing and Editing, The Oxford Canadian A to Z of Grammar, Spelling & Punctuation: Guide to Canadian English Usage (2nd ed.), Editing Canadian English, and the Canadian Oxford Dictionary all specify that an em dash should be set closed when used between words, a word and numeral, or two numerals.

The Australian government's Style Manual for Authors, Editors and Printers (6th ed.), also specifies that em dashes inserted between words, a word and numeral, or two numerals, should be set closed. A section on the 2-em rule (⸺) also explains that the 2-em can be used to mark an abrupt break in direct or reported speech, but a space is used before the 2-em if a complete word is missing, while no space is used if part of a word exists before the sudden break. Two examples of this are as follows:

- I distinctly heard him say, "Go away or I'll ——".
- It was alleged that D—— had been threatened with blackmail.

==== Approximating the em dash with two or three hyphens ====
When an em dash is unavailable in a particular character encoding environment—as in the ASCII character set—it has usually been approximated as consecutive double (--) or triple (---) hyphens. The two-hyphen em dash proxy is perhaps more common, being a widespread convention in the typewriting era. (It is still described for hard copy manuscript preparation in The Chicago Manual of Style as of the 16th edition, although the manual conveys that typewritten manuscript and copyediting on paper are now dated practices.) The three-hyphen em dash proxy was popular with various publishers because the sequence of one, two, or three hyphens could then correspond to the hyphen, en dash, and em dash, respectively.

Because early comic book letterers were not aware of the typographic convention of replacing a typewritten double hyphen with an em dash, the double hyphen became traditional in American comics. This practice has continued despite the development of computer lettering.

=== Usage in AI-generated text ===
A 2025 Rolling Stone article reported on the growing social media perception that the em dash was a hallmark of AI-generated writing, with several users calling it the "ChatGPT hyphen" and advising its avoidance. Writers defended the em dash as a legitimate and expressive punctuation mark with a long history in human writing, and that they used it frequently themselves. An OpenAI spokesperson stated that the style of ChatGPT's text depends on prompts and was not a reliable indicator of machine authorship.

== En dash versus em dash ==
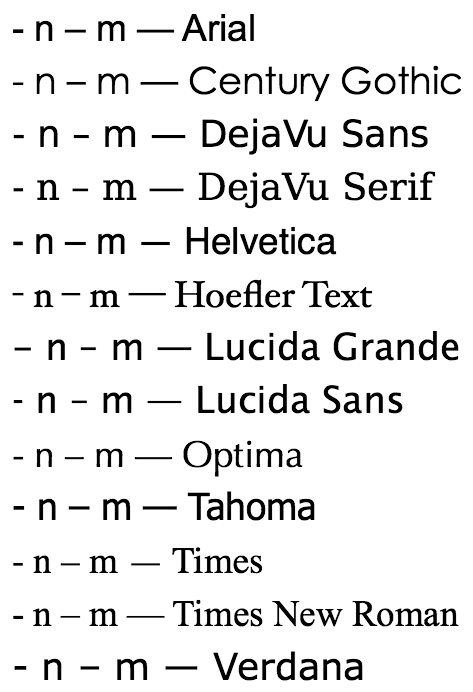
These comparisons of the hyphen (-), n, en dash (–), m, and em dash (—), in various 12-point fonts, illustrate the typical relationship between lengths ("- n – m —"). In some fonts, the en dash is not much longer than the hyphen, and in Lucida Grande, the en dash is actually shorter than the hyphen.

The en dash is wider than the hyphen but not as wide as the em dash. An em width is defined as the point size of the currently used font, since the M character is not always the width of the point size. In running text, various dash conventions are employed: an em dash—like so—or a spaced em dash — like so — or a spaced en dash – like so – can be seen in contemporary publications.

Various style guides and national varieties of languages prescribe different guidance on dashes. Dashes have been cited as being treated differently in the US and the UK, with the former preferring the use of an em dash with no additional spacing and the latter preferring a spaced en dash. As examples of the US style, The Chicago Manual of Style and The Publication Manual of the American Psychological Association recommend unspaced em dashes. Style guides outside the US are more variable. For example, The Elements of Typographic Style by Canadian typographer Robert Bringhurst recommends the spaced en dash – like so – and argues that the length and visual magnitude of an em dash "belongs to the padded and corseted aesthetic of Victorian typography". In the United Kingdom, the spaced en dash is the house style for certain major publishers, including the Penguin Group, the Cambridge University Press, and Routledge. However, this convention is not universal. The Oxford Guide to Style (2002, section 5.10.10) acknowledges that the spaced en dash is used by "other British publishers" but states that the Oxford University Press, like "most US publishers", uses the unspaced em dash. Fowler's Modern English Usage, saying that it is summarising the New Hart's Rules, describes the principal uses of the em dash as "a single dash used to introduce an explanation or expansion" and "a pair of dashes used to indicate asides and parentheses", without stipulating whether it should be spaced but giving only unspaced examples.

The en dash – always with spaces in running text when, as discussed in this section, indicating a parenthesis or pause – and the spaced em dash both have a certain technical advantage over the unspaced em dash. Most typesetting and word processing expects word spacing to vary to support full justification. Alone among punctuation that marks pauses or logical relations in text, the unspaced em dash disables this for the words it falls between. This can cause uneven spacing in the text, but can be mitigated by the use of thin spaces, hair spaces, or even zero-width spaces on the sides of the em dash. This provides the appearance of an unspaced em dash, but allows the words and dashes to break between lines. The spaced em dash risks introducing excessive separation of words. In full justification, the adjacent spaces may be stretched, and the separation of words further exaggerated. En dashes may also be preferred to em dashes when text is set in narrow columns, such as in newspapers and similar publications, since the en dash is smaller. In such cases, its use is based purely on space considerations and is not necessarily related to other typographical concerns.

On the other hand, a spaced en dash may be ambiguous when it is also used for ranges, for example, in dates or between geographical locations with internal spaces.

== Horizontal bar ==
The horizontal bar (U+2015 ― HORIZONTAL BAR), also known as a quotation dash, is used to introduce quoted text. This is the standard method of printing dialogue in some languages. The em dash is equally suitable if the quotation dash is unavailable or is contrary to the house style being used.

There is no support in the standard TeX fonts, but one can use \hbox{---}\kern-.5em--- or an em dash.

== Swung dash ==
The swung dash (U+2053 ⁓ SWUNG DASH) resembles a lengthened tilde and is used to separate alternatives or approximates. In dictionaries, it is frequently used to stand in for the term being defined. A dictionary entry providing an example for the term henceforth might employ the swung dash as follows:

henceforth (adv.) from this time forth; from now on; "⁓ she will be known as Mrs. Smith"

== Unicode ==
In the following tables, the "Em and 5×" column uses a capital M as a standard comparison to demonstrate the vertical position of different Unicode dash characters. "5×" means that there are five copies of this type of dash.

=== Unicode dash characters ===
This table lists characters with property Dash=yes in Unicode.

Code		Em and 5×	Name	Remark
U+002D	-	M-----	hyphen-minus	The ASCII hyphen. Sometimes this is used in groups to indicate different types of dash. In programming languages it is used as the minus sign.
U+058A	֊		Armenian hyphen	
U+05BE	־		Hebrew punctuation maqaf	
U+1400	᐀		Canadian syllabics hyphen	
U+1806	᠆		MONGOLIAN TODO SOFT HYPHEN	
U+2010	‐	M‐‐‐‐‐	hyphen	The character that can be used to unambiguously represent a hyphen.
U+2011	‑	M‑‑‑‑‑	non-breaking hyphen	Also called "hard hyphen", denotes a hyphen after which no word wrapping may apply. This is the case where the hyphen is part of a trigraph or tetragraph denoting a specific sound (like in the Swiss placename "S-chanf"), or where specific orthographic rules prevent a line break (like in German compounds of single-letter abbreviations and full nouns, as "E‑Mail").
U+2012	‒	M‒‒‒‒‒	figure dash	Similar to an en dash, but with exactly the width of a digit in the chosen typeface. The vertical position may also be centered on the zero digit, and thus higher than the en dash and em dash, which are appropriate for use with lowercase text in a vertical position similar to the hyphen. The figure dash may therefore be preferred to the en dash for indicating a closed range of values.
U+2013	–	M–––––	en dash	
U+2014	—	M—————	em dash	
U+2015	―	M―――――	horizontal bar	
U+2053	⁓	M⁓⁓⁓⁓⁓	swung dash	
U+207B	⁻	M⁻⁻⁻⁻⁻	superscript minus	Usually used together with superscripted numbers.
U+208B	₋	M₋₋₋₋₋	subscript minus	Usually used together with subscripted numbers.
U+2212	−	M−−−−−	minus sign	An arithmetic operation used in mathematics to represent subtraction or negative numbers. Its glyph is consistent with the glyph of the plus sign, and it is centred on the zero digit, unlike the ASCII hyphen-minus and U+2010 ‐ HYPHEN, that (especially the latter) are designed to match lowercase letters and are inconsistent with arithmetic operators.
U+2E17	⸗		DOUBLE OBLIQUE HYPHEN	Used in ancient Near-Eastern linguistics.
U+2E1A	⸚		HYPHEN WITH DIAERESIS	Used mostly in German dictionaries and indicates umlaut of the stem vowel of a plural form.
U+2E3A	⸺		two-em dash	Supplemental Punctuation.
U+2E3B	⸻		three-em dash	Supplemental Punctuation.
U+2E40	⹀		DOUBLE HYPHEN	Used in the transcription of old German manuscripts.
U+2E5D	⹝		OBLIQUE HYPHEN	Used in medieval European manuscripts.
U+301C	〜	M〜〜〜〜〜	WAVE DASH	Wavy lines found in some East Asian character sets. Typographically, they have the width of one CJK character frame (fullwidth form), and follow the direction of the text, being horizontal for horizontal text, and vertical for columnar. They are used as dashes, and occasionally as emphatic variants of the katakana vowel extender mark.
U+3030	〰	M〰〰〰〰〰	wavy dash	Wavy lines found in some East Asian character sets. Typographically, they have the width of one CJK character frame (fullwidth form), and follow the direction of the text, being horizontal for horizontal text, and vertical for columnar. They are used as dashes, and occasionally as emphatic variants of the katakana vowel extender mark.
U+30A0	゠		KATAKANA-HIRAGANA DOUBLE HYPHEN	
U+FE31	︱		PRESENTATION FORM FOR VERTICAL EM DASH	Compatibility characters used in East Asian typography.
U+FE32	︲		PRESENTATION FORM FOR VERTICAL EN DASH	Compatibility characters used in East Asian typography.
U+FE58	﹘	M﹘﹘﹘﹘﹘	SMALL EM DASH	Compatibility characters used in East Asian typography.
U+FE63	﹣	M﹣﹣﹣﹣﹣	SMALL HYPHEN-MINUS	Compatibility characters used in East Asian typography.
U+FF0D	－	M－－－－－	FULLWIDTH HYPHEN-MINUS	Compatibility characters used in East Asian typography.
U+10D6E	𐵮		GARAY HYPHEN	
U+10EAD	𐺭		YEZIDI HYPHENATION MARK	

=== Related characters ===
This table lists characters similar to dashes, but with property Dash=no in Unicode.

Code		M and 5×	Name	Remark
U+005F	_	M_____	low line	ASCII underscore, usually a horizontal line below the baseline (i.e. a spacing underscore). It is commonly used within URLs and identifiers in programming languages, where a space-like separation between parts is desired but a real space is not appropriate. As usual for ASCII characters, this character shows a considerable range of glyphic variation; therefore, whether sequences of this character connect depends on the font used. See also U+FF3F ＿ FULLWIDTH LOW LINE
U+007E	~	M~~~~~	tilde	Used in programming languages (e.g. for the bitwise NOT operator in C and C++). Its glyphic representation varies, therefore for punctuation in running text the use of more specific characters is preferred, see above.
U+00AD			soft hyphen	Used to indicate where a line may break, as in a compound word or between syllables.
U+00AF	¯	M¯¯¯¯¯	macron	A horizontal line positioned at cap height usually having the same length as U+005F _ LOW LINE. It is a spacing character, related to the diacritic mark "macron". A sequence of such characters is not expected to connect, unlike U+203E ‾ OVERLINE.
U+02C9	ˉ	Mˉˉˉˉˉ	modifier letter macron	A phonetic symbol (a line applied above the base letter).
U+02CD	ˍ	Mˍˍˍˍˍ	modifier letter low macron	A phonetic symbol (a line applied below the base letter).
U+02D7	˗	M˗˗˗˗˗	modifier letter minus sign	A variant of the minus sign used in phonetics to mark a retracted or backed articulation. It may show small end-serifs.
U+02DC	˜	M˜˜˜˜˜	small tilde	A spacing clone of tilde diacritic mark.
U+06D4	۔		Arabic full stop	
U+1428	ᐨ		Canadian syllabics final short horizontal stroke	
U+1B78	᭸		Balinese musical symbol left-hand open pang	
U+203E	‾	M‾‾‾‾‾	overline	A character similar to U+00AF ¯ MACRON, but a sequence of such characters usually connects.
U+2043	⁃	M⁃⁃⁃⁃⁃	hyphen bullet	A short horizontal line used as a list bullet.
U+223C	∼	M∼∼∼∼∼	tilde operator	Used in mathematics. Ends not curved as much regular tilde. In TeX and LaTeX, this character can be expressed using the math mode command $\sim$.
U+23AF	⎯	M⎯⎯⎯⎯⎯	horizontal line extension	Miscellaneous Technical (Unicode block). "Used for extension of arrows". Can be used in sequences to generate long connected horizontal lines.
U+23BA	⎺	M⎺⎺⎺⎺⎺	horizontal scan line-1	"Refer to old, low-resolution technology for terminals, with only 9 scan lines per fixed-size character glyph". The scan line-5 is unified with U+2500 ─ BOX DRAWINGS LIGHT HORIZONTAL.
U+23BB	⎻	M⎻⎻⎻⎻⎻	horizontal scan line-3	"Refer to old, low-resolution technology for terminals, with only 9 scan lines per fixed-size character glyph". The scan line-5 is unified with U+2500 ─ BOX DRAWINGS LIGHT HORIZONTAL.
U+23BC	⎼	M⎼⎼⎼⎼⎼	horizontal scan line-7	"Refer to old, low-resolution technology for terminals, with only 9 scan lines per fixed-size character glyph". The scan line-5 is unified with U+2500 ─ BOX DRAWINGS LIGHT HORIZONTAL.
U+23BD	⎽	M⎽⎽⎽⎽⎽	horizontal scan line-9	"Refer to old, low-resolution technology for terminals, with only 9 scan lines per fixed-size character glyph". The scan line-5 is unified with U+2500 ─ BOX DRAWINGS LIGHT HORIZONTAL.
U+23E4	⏤	M⏤⏤⏤⏤⏤	straightness	Miscellaneous Technical (Unicode block). Represents line straightness in technical context.
U+2500	─	M─────	box drawings light horizontal	Box-drawing characters. Several similar characters from one Unicode block used to draw horizontal lines.
U+2501	━	M━━━━━	box drawings heavy horizontal	Box-drawing characters. Several similar characters from one Unicode block used to draw horizontal lines.
U+268A	⚊		monogram for yang	I Ching monogram symbols, often used to form trigrams or hexagrams.
U+268B	⚋		monogram for yin	I Ching monogram symbols, often used to form trigrams or hexagrams.
U+2796	➖	M➖➖➖➖➖	heavy minus sign	Unicode symbols.
U+2E0F	⸏		paragraphos	Ancient Greek textual symbol, usually displayed by a long low line.
U+3161	ㅡ		HANGUL LETTER EU	Hangul letters used in Korean to denote the sound [ɯ]. The halfwidth form is a compatibility character used in East Asian typography.
U+1173	ᅳ		HANGUL JUNGSEONG EU	Hangul letters used in Korean to denote the sound [ɯ]. The halfwidth form is a compatibility character used in East Asian typography.
U+FFDA	ￚ		HALFWIDTH HANGUL LETTER EU	Hangul letters used in Korean to denote the sound [ɯ]. The halfwidth form is a compatibility character used in East Asian typography.
U+30FC	ー		KATAKANA-HIRAGANA PROLONGED SOUND MARK	Japanese chōonpu, used in Japanese to indicate a long vowel. The halfwidth form is a compatibility character used in East Asian typography.
U+FF70	ｰ		HALFWIDTH KATAKANA-HIRAGANA PROLONGED SOUND MARK	Japanese chōonpu, used in Japanese to indicate a long vowel. The halfwidth form is a compatibility character used in East Asian typography.
U+4E00	一		CJK UNIFIED IDEOGRAPH-4E00	Chinese character for "one", used in various East Asian languages.
U+A4FE	꓾		Lisu punctuation comma	Looks like a sequence of a hyphen and a full stop (period).
U+FF5E	～	M～～～～～	Fullwidth tilde	Compatibility character used in East Asian typography.
U+10110	𐄐		Aegean number ten	
U+10191	𐆑		roman uncia sign	A symbol for an ancient Roman unit of length.
U+1104B	𑁋		Brahmi punctuation line	Symbols for Brahmi script
U+11052	𑁒		Brahmi number one	Brahmi digit for "one".
U+110BE	𑂾		Kaithi section mark	A symbol for Kaithi that indicates the end of a sentence.
U+1CE1F	𜸟	M𜸟𜸟𜸟𜸟𜸟	Large type piece crossbar	Used to form a large text character in legacy computing.
U+1D360	𝍠		Counting rod unit digit one	Counting rod digit for "one", used in calculation in ancient East Asia.
U+1D372	𝍲		Ideographic tally mark one	A tally mark based on segments from the Chinese character "正".
U+1D2E5	𝋥		Mayan numeral five	Mayan number for "five".

== In other languages ==
In many languages, such as Polish, the em dash is used as an opening quotation mark. There is no matching closing quotation mark; typically a new paragraph will be started, introduced by a dash, for each turn in the dialogue.

Corpus studies indicate that em dashes are more commonly used in Russian than in English. In Russian, the em dash is used for the present copula (meaning 'am/is/are'), which is unpronounced in spoken Russian.

In French and Italian, em or en dashes can be used as parentheses (brackets), but the use of a second dash as a closing parenthesis is optional. When a closing dash is not used, the sentence is ended with a period (full stop) as usual. Dashes are, however, much less common than parentheses.

In Spanish, em dashes can be used to mark off parenthetical phrases. Unlike in English, the em dashes are spaced like brackets, i.e., there is a space between main sentence and dash, but not between parenthetical phrase and dash. For example: "Llevaba la fidelidad a su maestro —un buen profesor— hasta extremos insospechados." (In English: 'He took his loyalty to his teacher – a good teacher – to unsuspected extremes.')

== See also ==
- Compound point – dashes preceded by colons, semicolons, commas or full stops
- Leiden Conventions – rules to indicate conditions in texts (usage of "[— — —]")
- Signature dashes – signature delimiter in emails (usage of "-- " in a single line)
- Whitespace characters – spaces of equivalent sizes to dashes
