= Non-printing character in word processors =

Formatting marks for content design

Non-printing characters or formatting marks are characters for content designing in word processors, which are not displayed at printing. It is also possible to customize their display on the monitor. The most common non-printable characters in word processors are pilcrow, space, non-breaking space, tab character etc.

== Characters ==
To display characters on the monitor screen in Microsoft Word (Home tab) or OpenOffice.org and its derivatives (upper panel), press the icon ¶. The following symbols will be displayed:

- Space (·) each pressing of the space key will be displayed like this.
- Non-breaking space (°) is a space character that prevents an automatic line break at its position.
- Pilcrow (¶) is the symbolic representation of paragraphs.
- Line break (↵) breaks the current line without new paragraph. It puts lines of text close together.
- Tab character (→) is used to align text horizontally to the next tab stop.
- End-of-cell and end-of row markers (¤) appear automatically in each box when display of non-printable characters turned on.
- Soft hyphen or non-breaking hyphen (-) is a hidden separator for hyphenation in the places specified by the user, regardless of the automatic hyphenation.
- ············Page Break············, ::::::::::Section Break::::::::::, or ············Column Break············

.

== Key combinations ==
| Name | Common view | Common key combinationsfor Microsoft Word, LibreOffice, OpenOffice.org (from 3.0) | Key combination in other word processors | Windows Alt Key Codes | Unicode name | Unicode code (HEX) | Unicode code (DEC) |
|---|---|---|---|---|---|---|---|
| Space | · | Space | | | SPACE | 0x20 | 0032 |
| Non-breaking space | ° | Ctrl+⇧ Shift+Space | Ctrl+Space for FrameMaker, LyX (non-Mac), OpenOffice.org (before 3.0), WordPerfect | Alt+0+1+6+0 or Alt+2+5+5 (not always works) | NO-BREAK SPACE | 00A0 | 0160 |
| Pilcrow | ¶ | ↵ Enter | | Alt+0182 or Alt+20 (on number keyboard). | | | |
| Line break | ↵ | ⇧ Shift+↵ Enter | | | | | |
| Tab character | → | Tab ↹ | | | | | |
| Soft hyphen | ¬ | Ctrl+- | | | | | 2011 |
| Page break | ···Page Break··· | Ctrl+↵ Enter | | | | | |

== See also ==
- Control characters
