= Space (punctuation) =

Blank area that separates text

o

Space
- U+0020 SPACE (Note: Representations here of a regular space are replaced with a no-break space.)

See also
- U+00A0 NO-BREAK SPACE (&nbsp;, &NonBreakingSpace;); Other types of spaces

In writing, a space ( ) is a blank area that separates words, sentences, and other written or printed glyphs (characters). Conventions for spacing vary among languages, and in some languages the spacing rules are complex. Inter-word spaces ease the reader's task of identifying words, and avoid outright ambiguities such as "now here" vs. "nowhere". They also provide convenient guides for where a human or program may start new lines.

Typesetting can use spaces of varying widths, just as it can use graphic characters of varying widths. Unlike graphic characters, typeset spaces are commonly stretched in order to align text. A typewriter, on the other hand, typically has only one width for all characters, including spaces. Following widespread acceptance of the typewriter, some typewriter conventions influenced typography and the design of printed works.

Computer representation of text facilitates getting around mechanical and physical limitations such as character widths in at least two ways:

- Character encodings such as Unicode provide spaces of several widths, which are encoded using distinct numeric code points. For example, Unicode U+0020 is the "normal" space character, but U+00A0 adds the meaning that a new line should not be started there, while U+2003 represents a space with a fixed width of one em. Collectively, such characters are called whitespace characters.
- Formatting and drawing languages and software commonly provide much more flexibility in spacing. For example, SVG, PostScript, and countless other languages enable drawing characters at specific (x,y) coordinates on a screen or page. By drawing each word at a specific starting coordinate, such programs need not "draw" spaces at all (this can lead to difficulties in extracting the correct text back out). Similarly, word processors can "fully justify" text, stretching inter-word spaces to make all lines the same length (as can mechanical Linotype machines). Precision is limited by physical capabilities of output devices.

== Use in natural languages ==
=== Between words ===
Modern English uses a space to separate words, but not all languages follow this practice. According to Paul Saenger in Space Between Words: The Origins of Silent Reading, Ancient Hebrew and Arabic did use spaces partly to compensate in clarity for the lack of written vowels when no mater lectionis was used for a vowel, though in the Middle Ages they sometimes omitted spaces when vowel points were marked. The earliest Greek script also used interpuncts to divide words rather than spacing, although this practice was soon displaced by the scriptio continua. In Latin, spaces and interpuncts came often to be dropped in favor of scriptio continua, and were not used to separate words again until roughly AD 600–800.

Word spacing was later used by Irish and Anglo-Saxon scribes, beginning after the creation of the Carolingian minuscule by Alcuin of York and the scribes’ adoption of it. Spacing would become standard in Renaissance Italy and France, and then Byzantium by the end of the 16th century; then entering into the Slavic languages in Cyrillic in the 17th century, and only in modern times entering modern Sanskrit.

CJK languages do not use spaces when dealing with text containing mostly Chinese characters and kana. In Japanese, spaces may occasionally be used to separate people’s family names from given names, to denote omitted particles (especially the topic particle wa), and for certain literary or artistic effects. Modern Korean, however, has spaces as an essential part of its writing system (because of Western influence), given the phonetic nature of the hangul script that requires word dividers to avoid ambiguity, as opposed to Chinese characters which are mostly very distinguishable from each other. In Korean, spaces are used to separate chunks of nouns, nouns and particles, adjectives, and verbs; for certain compounds or phrases, spaces may be used or not, as in the phrase for “Republic of Korea,” usually spelled without spaces as 대한민국 rather than with a space as 대한 민국.

Runic texts use either an interpunct-like or a colon-like punctuation mark to separate words. There are two Unicode characters dedicated for this: U+16EB ᛫ RUNIC SINGLE PUNCTUATION and U+16EC ᛬ RUNIC MULTIPLE PUNCTUATION.

=== Between sentences ===
Languages with a Latin-derived alphabet have used various methods of sentence spacing since the advent of movable type in the 15th century.

- One space (sometimes called French spacing). This is a common convention in most countries that use the ISO basic Latin alphabet for published and final written work, as well as digital (World Wide Web) media. Web browsers usually do not differentiate between single and multiple spaces in source code when displaying text, unless the text is given a "white-space" CSS attribute. Without this being set, collapsing strings of spaces to a single space allow HTML source code to be spaced in a more machine-readable way, at the expense of control over the spacing of the rendered page.
- Double space (English spacing). It is sometimes claimed that this convention stems from the use of the monospaced font on typewriters. However, instructions to use more spacing between sentences than words date back centuries, and two spaces on a typewriter was the closest approximation to typesetters' previous rules aimed at improving readability. Wider spacing continued to be used by both typesetters and typists until the Second World War, after which typesetters gradually transitioned to word spacing between sentences in published print, while typists continued the practice of using two spaces.
- One widened space, typically one-and-a-third to slightly less than twice as wide as a word space. This spacing was sometimes used in typesetting before the 19th century. It has also been used in other non-typewriter typesetting systems such as the Linotype machine and the TeX system. Modern computer-based digital fonts can adjust the spacing after terminal punctuation as well, creating a space slightly wider than a standard word space.

There has been some controversy regarding the proper amount of sentence spacing in typeset material. The Elements of Typographic Style states that only a single word space is required for sentence spacing. Psychological studies suggest "readers benefit from having two spaces after periods."

=== Unit symbols and numbers ===
The International System of Units (SI) prescribes inserting a space between a number and a unit of measurement (the space being regarded as an implied multiplication sign) but never between a prefix and a base unit; a space (or a multiplication dot) should also be used between units in compound units.

- 5.0 cm, not 5.0cm or 5.0 c m or 5.0 cms
- 45 kg, not 45kg or 45 k g or 45 kgs
- 32 °C, not 32°C or 32° C
- 20 kN m or 20 kN⋅m, not 20 kNm or 20 k Nm
- π/2 rad, not π/2rad or π / 2 rad

The only exception to this rule is the traditional symbolic notation of angles: degree (e.g., 30°), minute of arc (e.g., 22′), and second of arc (e.g., 8″).

The SI also prescribes the use of a space (often typographically a thin space) as a thousands separator where required. Both the point and the comma are reserved as decimal markers.

- 1 000 000 000 000 (thin space) or 1000000 not 1,000,000 or 1.000.000
- 1 000 000 000 000 (regular space which is significantly wider)

Sometimes a narrow non-breaking space or non-breaking space, respectively, is recommended (as in, for example, IEEE Standards and IEC standards) to avoid the separation of units and values or parts of compounds units, due to automatic line wrap and word wrap.

== Encoding ==
Unicode defines many variants of a single whitespace character, with various properties; the more commonly encountered variations include:

- U+0020 SPACE
- U+00A0 NO-BREAK SPACE
- U+2002 EN SPACE
- U+2003 EM SPACE

In URLs, spaces are percent encoded with its ASCII/UTF-8 representation %20.

=== Types of spaces ===
- Figure space
- Non-breaking space
- Thin space
- Visible space
- Whitespace character § Hair spaces around dashes
- Zero-width space

== See also ==
- Em (typography)
- En (typography)
- Halfwidth and fullwidth forms
- Internal field separator
- Sentence spacing in digital media
- Underscore
- Whitespace character
