= Whitespace character =

Computer text file character representing blank space

A whitespace character is a character data element that represents white space when text is rendered for display by a computer.

For example, a space character (U+0020 SPACE, ASCII 32) represents blank space such as a word divider in a Western script.

A printable character results in output when rendered, but a whitespace character does not. Instead, whitespace characters define the layout of text to a limited degree, interrupting the normal sequence of rendering characters next to each other. The output of subsequent characters is typically shifted to the right (or to the left for right-to-left script) or to the start of the next line. The effect of multiple sequential whitespace characters is cumulative such that the next printable character is rendered at a location based on the accumulated effect of preceding whitespace characters.

The origin of the term whitespace is rooted in the common practice of rendering text on white paper. Normally, a whitespace character is not rendered as white. It affects rendering, but it is not itself rendered.

== Overview ==
Width of various Unicode space characters

A space character typically inserts horizontal space that is about as wide as a letter. For a monospaced font the width is the width of a letter, and for a variable-width font the width is font-specific. Some fonts support multiple space characters that have different widths.

A tab character typically inserts horizontal space that is based on tab stops which vary by application.

A newline character sequence typically moves the render output location to the beginning of the next line. If one follows text, it does not actually result in whitespace. But, two sequential newline sequences between text blocks results in a blank line between the blocks. The height of the blank line varies by application.

Using whitespace characters to lay out text is a convention. Applications sometimes render whitespace characters as visible markup so that a user can see what is normally not visible.

Typically, a user types a space character by pressing spacebar, a tab character by pressing Tab ↹ and newline by pressing ↵ Enter.

== Unicode ==
The table below lists the twenty-five characters defined as whitespace ("WSpace=Y", "WS") characters in the Unicode Character Database. Seventeen use a definition of whitespace consistent with the algorithm for bidirectional writing ("Bidirectional Character Type=WS") and are known as "Bidi-WS" characters. The remaining characters may also be used, but are not of this "Bidi" type.

Note: Depending on the browser and fonts used to view the following table, not all spaces may be displayed properly.

Unicode characters with property White_Space=yes (Note: White_Space is a binary Unicode property.)
Name	Code point		Width box	May break?	In IDN?	Script	Block	General category	Notes
character tabulation	U+0009	9		Yes	No	Common	Basic Latin	Other, control	HT, Horizontal Tab. HTML/XML named entity: &Tab;, LaTeX: \tab, C escape: \t
line feed	U+000A	10	Is a line-break			Common	Basic Latin	Other, control	LF, Line feed. HTML/XML named entity: &NewLine;, C escape: \n
line tabulation	U+000B	11	Is a line-break			Common	Basic Latin	Other, control	VT, Vertical Tab. C escape: \v
form feed	U+000C	12	Is a line-break			Common	Basic Latin	Other, control	FF, Form feed. C escape: \f
carriage return	U+000D	13	Is a line-break			Common	Basic Latin	Other, control	CR, Carriage return. C escape: \r
space	U+0020	32		Yes	No	Common	Basic Latin	Separator, space	Most common (normal ASCII space). LaTeX: \
next line	U+0085	133	Is a line-break			Common	Latin-1; Supplement	Other, control	NEL, Next line. LaTeX: \\
no-break space	U+00A0	160		No	No	Common	Latin-1; Supplement	Separator, space	Non-breaking space: identical to U+0020, but not a point at which a line may be broken. HTML/XML named entity: &nbsp;, &NonBreakingSpace;, LaTeX: ~
ogham space mark	U+1680	5760		Yes	No	Ogham	Ogham	Separator, space	Used for interword separation in Ogham text. Normally a vertical line in vertical text or a horizontal line in horizontal text, but may also be a blank space in "stemless" fonts. Requires an Ogham font.
en quad	U+2000	8192		Yes	No	Common	General; Punctuation	Separator, space	Width of one en. U+2002 is canonically equivalent to this character; U+2002 is preferred.
em quad	U+2001	8193		Yes	No	Common	General; Punctuation	Separator, space	Also known as "mutton quad". Width of one em. U+2003 is canonically equivalent to this character; U+2003 is preferred.
en space	U+2002	8194		Yes	No	Common	General; Punctuation	Separator, space	Also known as "nut". Width of one en. U+2000 En Quad is canonically equivalent to this character; U+2002 is preferred. HTML/XML named entity: &ensp;, LaTeX: \enspace (the LaTeX en space is a no-break space)
em space	U+2003	8195		Yes	No	Common	General; Punctuation	Separator, space	Also known as "mutton". Width of one em. U+2001 Em Quad is canonically equivalent to this character; U+2003 is preferred. HTML/XML named entity: &emsp;, LaTeX: \quad
three-per-em space	U+2004	8196		Yes	No	Common	General; Punctuation	Separator, space	Also known as "thick space". One third of an em wide. HTML/XML named entity: &emsp13;, LaTeX: \; (the LaTeX thick space is a no-break space)
four-per-em space	U+2005	8197		Yes	No	Common	General; Punctuation	Separator, space	Also known as "mid space". One fourth of an em wide. HTML/XML named entity: &emsp14;
six-per-em space	U+2006	8198		Yes	No	Common	General; Punctuation	Separator, space	One sixth of an em wide. In computer typography, sometimes equated to U+2009.
figure space	U+2007	8199		No	No	Common	General; Punctuation	Separator, space	Figure space. In fonts with monospaced digits, equal to the width of one digit. HTML/XML named entity: &numsp;
punctuation space	U+2008	8200		Yes	No	Common	General; Punctuation	Separator, space	As wide as the narrow punctuation in a font, i.e. the advance width of the period or comma. HTML/XML named entity: &puncsp;
thin space	U+2009	8201		Yes	No	Common	General; Punctuation	Separator, space	Thin space; one-fifth (sometimes one-sixth) of an em wide. Recommended for use as a thousands separator for measures made with SI units. Unlike U+2002 to U+2008, its width may get adjusted in typesetting. HTML/XML named entity: &thinsp;, &ThinSpace;, LaTeX: \, (the LaTeX thin space is a no-break space)
hair space	U+200A	8202		Yes	No	Common	General; Punctuation	Separator, space	Thinner than a thin space. HTML/XML named entity: &hairsp;, &VeryThinSpace;
line separator	U+2028	8232	Is a line-break			Common	General; Punctuation	Separator, line	
paragraph separator	U+2029	8233	Is a line-break			Common	General; Punctuation	Separator, paragraph	
narrow no-break space	U+202F	8239		No	No	Common	General; Punctuation	Separator, space	Narrow no-break space. Similar in function to U+00A0 No-Break Space. When used with Mongolian, its width is usually one third of the normal space; in other context, its width sometimes resembles that of the Thin Space (U+2009). LaTeX: \,
medium mathematical space	U+205F	8287		Yes	No	Common	General; Punctuation	Separator, space	MMSP. Used in mathematical formulae. Four-eighteenths of an em. In mathematical typography, the widths of spaces are usually given in integral multiples of an eighteenth of an em, and 4/18 em may be used in several situations, for example between the a and the + and between the + and the b in the expression a + b. HTML/XML named entity: &MediumSpace;, LaTeX: \: (the LaTeX medium space is a no-break space)
ideographic space	U+3000	12288		Yes	No	Common	CJK Symbols and Punctuation	Separator, space	As wide as a CJK character cell (fullwidth). Used, for example, in tai tou.

Related Unicode characters with property White_Space=no
Name	Code point		Width box	May break?	In IDN?	Script	Block	General category	Notes
mongolian vowel separator	U+180E	6158	᠎	Yes	No	Mongolian	Mongolian	Other, Format	MVS. A narrow space character, used in Mongolian to cause the final two characters of a word to take on different shapes. It is no longer classified as space character (i.e. in Zs category) in Unicode 6.3.0, even though it was in previous versions of the standard.
zero width space	U+200B	8203		Yes	No	Common	General; Punctuation	Other, Format	ZWSP, zero-width space. Used to indicate word boundaries to text processing systems when using scripts that do not use explicit spacing. It is similar to the soft hyphen, with the difference that the latter is used to indicate syllable boundaries, and should display a visible hyphen when the line breaks at it. HTML/XML named entity: &ZeroWidthSpace; (Note: Although &ZeroWidthSpace; is one HTML5 named entity for U+200B, the additional names NegativeMediumSpace, NegativeThickSpace, NegativeThinSpace and NegativeVeryThinSpace (which are names used in the Wolfram Language for negative-advance spaces, which it maps to the Private Use Area) are also defined by HTML5 as aliases for U+200B (e.g. &NegativeMediumSpace;).)
zero width non-joiner	U+200C	8204	‌	Yes	Context-dependent	Inherited	General; Punctuation	Other, Format	ZWNJ, zero-width non-joiner. When placed between two characters that would otherwise be connected, a ZWNJ causes them to be printed in their final and initial forms, respectively. HTML/XML named entity: &zwnj;
zero width joiner	U+200D	8205	‍	Yes	Context-dependent	Inherited	General; Punctuation	Other, Format	ZWJ, zero-width joiner. When placed between two characters that would otherwise not be connected, a ZWJ causes them to be printed in their connected forms. Can also be used to display joining forms in isolation. Depending on whether a ligature or conjunct is expected by default, can either induce (as in emoji and in Sinhala) or suppress (as in Devanagari) substitution with a single glyph, whilst still permitting use of individual joining forms (unlike ZWNJ). HTML/XML named entity: &zwj;
word joiner	U+2060	8288		No	No	Common	General; Punctuation	Other, Format	WJ, word joiner. Similar to U+200B, but not a point at which a line may be broken. HTML/XML named entity: &NoBreak;
zero width non-breaking space	U+FEFF	65279		No	No	Common	Arabic; Presentation; Forms-B	Other, Format	Zero-width non-breaking space. Used primarily as a Byte Order Mark. Use as an indication of non-breaking is deprecated as of Unicode 3.2; see U+2060 instead.

=== Substitute images ===
Unicode also provides some visible characters that can be used to represent various whitespace characters, in contexts where a visible symbol must be displayed:

Unicode space-illustrating characters (visible)
Code	Decimal	Name	Block	Display	Description
U+00B7	183	Middle dot	Latin-1 Supplement	·	Interpunct; Named entity: &middot;
U+21A1	8609	Downwards two headed arrow	Arrows	↡	ECMA-17 / ISO 2047 symbol for form feed (page break)
U+2261	8810	Identical to	Mathematical; Operators	≡	Amongst other uses, is the ECMA-17 / ISO 2047 symbol for line feed
U+237D	9085	Shouldered open box	Miscellaneous Technical	⍽	Used to indicate a NBSP
U+23CE	9166	Return symbol	Miscellaneous Technical	⏎	Symbol for a return key, which enters a line break
U+2409	9225	Symbol for horizontal tabulation	Control Pictures	␉	Substitutes for a tab character
U+240A	9226	Symbol for line feed	Control Pictures	␊	Substitutes for a line feed
U+240B	9227	Symbol for vertical tabulation	Control Pictures	␋	Substitutes for a vertical tab (line tab)
U+240C	9228	Symbol for form feed	Control Pictures	␌	Substitutes for a form feed (page break)
U+240D	9229	Symbol for carriage return	Control Pictures	␍	Substitutes for a carriage return
U+2420	9248	Symbol for space	Control Pictures	␠	Substitutes for an ASCII space
U+2422	9250	Blank symbol	Control Pictures	␢	aka "substitute blank", used in BCDIC, EBCDIC, ASCII-1963 etc. as a symbol for the word separator
U+2423	9251	Open box	Control Pictures	␣	Used in block letter handwriting at least since the 1980s when it is necessary to explicitly indicate the number of space characters (e.g. when programming with pen and paper). Used in a textbook (published 1982, 1984, 1985, 1988 by Springer-Verlag) on Modula-2, a programming language where space codes require explicit indication. Also used in the keypad (Note: Above the zero "0" or negative "(‒)" key.) of the Texas Instruments' TI-8x series of graphing calculators. Named entity: &blank;
U+2424	9252	Symbol for newline	Control Pictures	␤	Substitutes for a line break
U+25B3	9651	White up-pointing triangle	Geometric Shapes	△	Amongst other uses, is the ECMA-17 / ISO 2047 symbol for the ASCII space
U+2A5B	10843	Logical Or with middle stem	Supplemental; Mathematical; Operators	⩛	Amongst other uses, is the ECMA-17 / ISO 2047 symbol for vertical tab (line tab)
U+2AAA	10922	Smaller than	Supplemental; Mathematical; Operators	⪪	Amongst other uses, is the ECMA-17 / ISO 2047 symbol for carriage return
U+2AAB	10923	Larger than	Supplemental; Mathematical; Operators	⪫	Amongst other uses, is the ECMA-17 / ISO 2047 symbol for the tab character
U+2B1A	11034	Dotted square	Miscellaneous; Symbols and Arrows	⬚	
U+3037	12343	Ideographic Telegraph Line Feed; Separator Symbol	CJK Symbols and Punctuation	〷	Graphic used for code 9999 in Chinese telegraph code, representing a line feed

Exact space

- The Cambridge Z88 provided a special "exact space" (code point 160 aka 0xA0) (invokable by key shortcut ⌑+SPACE), displayed as "…" by the operating system's display driver. It was therefore also known as "dot space" in conjunction with BBC BASIC.
- Under code point 224 (0xE0) the computer also provided a special three-character-cells-wide SPACE symbol "SPC" (analogous to Unicode's single-cell-wide U+2420).

=== Non-space blanks ===
- The Braille Patterns Unicode block contains U+2800 ⠀ BRAILLE PATTERN BLANK, a Braille pattern with no dots raised. Some fonts display the character as a fixed-width blank, however the Unicode standard explicitly states that it does not act as a space.
- Unicode's coverage of the Korean alphabet includes several code points which represent the absence of a written letter, and thus do not display a glyph:
  - Unicode includes a Hangul Filler character in the Hangul Compatibility Jamo block (U+3164 ㅤ HANGUL FILLER). This is classified as a letter, but displayed as an empty space, like a Hangul block containing no jamo. It is used in KS X 1001 Hangul combining sequences to introduce them or denote the absence of a letter in a position, but not in Unicode's combining jamo system.
  - Unicode's combining jamo system uses similar Hangul Choseong Filler and Hangul Jungseong Filler characters to denote the absence of a letter in initial or medial position within a syllable block, which are included in the Hangul Jamo block (U+115F ᅟ HANGUL CHOSEONG FILLER, U+1160 ᅠ HANGUL JUNGSEONG FILLER).
  - Additionally, a Halfwidth Hangul Filler is included in the Halfwidth and Fullwidth Forms (U+FFA0 ﾠ HALFWIDTH HANGUL FILLER), which is used when mapping from encodings which include characters from both Johab (or Wansung) and N-byte Hangul (or its EBCDIC counterpart), such as IBM-933, which includes both Johab and EBCDIC fillers.

== Whitespace and digital typography ==
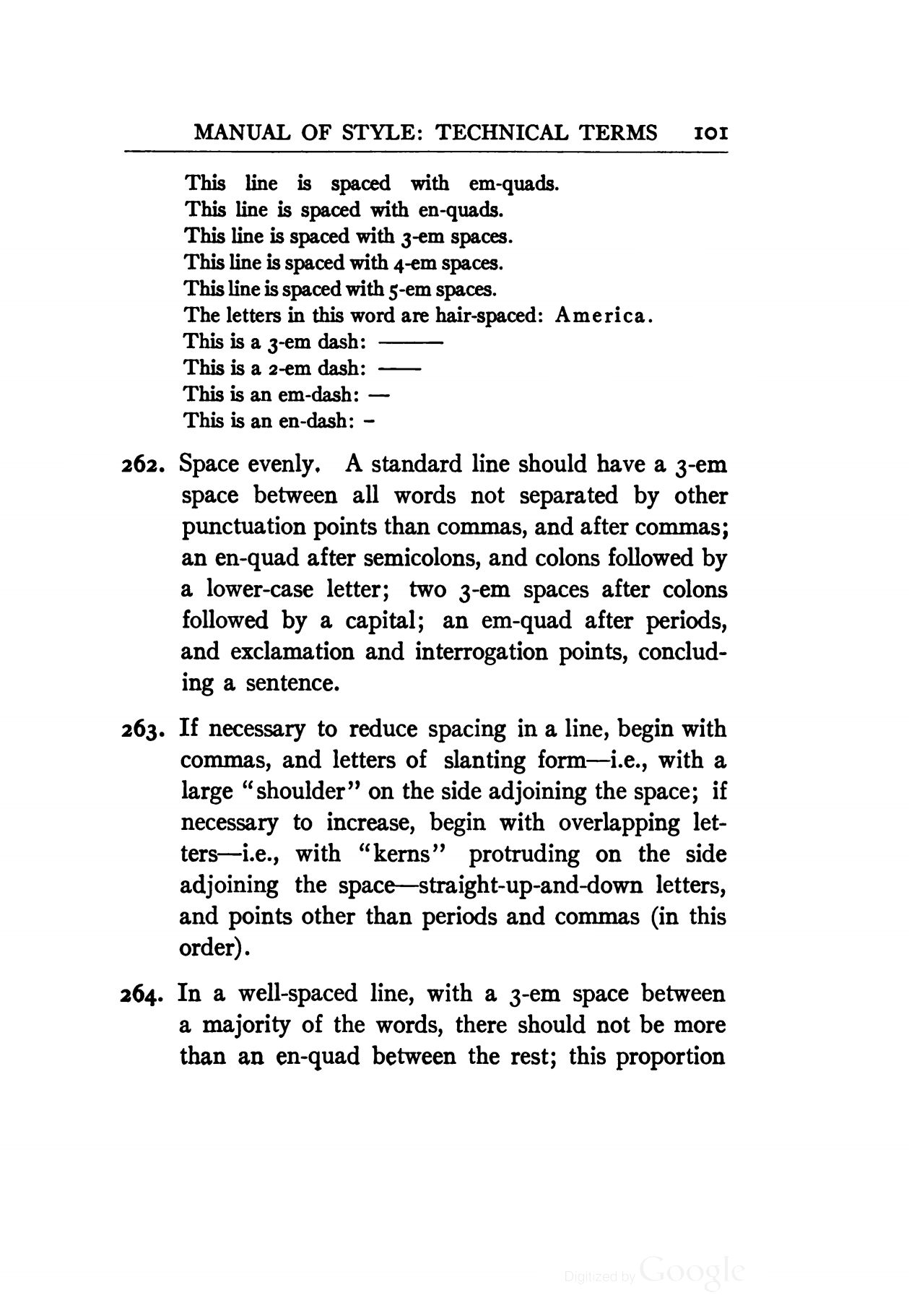
The Chicago Manual of Style has rules for using the different sized whitespaces.

=== On-screen display ===
Text editors, word processors, and desktop publishing software differ in how they represent whitespace on the screen, and how they represent spaces at the ends of lines longer than the screen or column width. In some cases, spaces are shown simply as blank space; in other cases they may be represented by an interpunct or other symbols. Many different characters (described below) could be used to produce spaces, and non-character functions (such as margins and tab settings) can also affect whitespace.

Many of the Unicode space characters were created for compatibility with classic print typography.

Even if digital typography has algorithmic kerning and justification, those space characters can be used to supplement the electronic formatting when needed.

=== Variable-width general-purpose space ===
In computer character encodings, there is a normal general-purpose space (Unicode character U+0020) whose width will vary according to the design of the typeface. Typical values range from 1/5 em to 1/3 em (in digital typography an em is equal to the nominal size of the font, so for a 10-point font the space will probably be between 2 and 3.3 points). Sophisticated fonts may have differently sized spaces for bold, italic, and small-caps faces, and often compositors will manually adjust the width of the space depending on the size and prominence of the text.

In addition to this general-purpose space, it is possible to encode a space of a specific width. See the table above for a complete list.

=== Hair spaces around dashes ===
Em dashes used as parenthetical dividers, and en dashes when used as word joiners, are usually set continuous with the text. However, such a dash can optionally be surrounded with a hair space (U+200A) or a thin space (U+2009). The hair space can be written in HTML by using &hairsp; and the thin space is &thinsp;. These spaces are much thinner than a normal space (except in a monospaced font), with the hair space in particular being the thinnest of horizontal whitespace characters.

Normal space versus hair and thin spaces (as rendered by your browser)
Space	En dash	Em dash
Normal space	left – right	left — right
Thin space	left – right	left — right
Hair space	left – right	left — right
No space	left–right	left—right

== Computing applications ==
=== Programming languages ===
In most programming language syntax, whitespace characters can be used to separate tokens. For a free-form language, whitespace characters are ignored by code processors (i.e. compiler). Even when language syntax requires white space, often multiple whitespace characters are treated the same as a single. In an off-side rule language, indentation white space is syntactically significant. In the satirical and contrarian language called Whitespace, whitespace characters are the only significant characters and normal text is ignored.

Good use of white space in source code can group related logic and make the code easier to understand. Excessive use of whitespace, including at the end of a line where it provides no rendering behavior, is considered a nuisance.

Most languages only recognize whitespace characters that have an ASCII code. They disallow most or all of the Unicode codes listed above. The C language defines whitespace characters to be "space, horizontal tab, new-line, vertical tab, and form-feed". The HTTP network protocol requires different types of whitespace to be used in different parts of the protocol; it requires single space characters between items in the status line, a CR/LF pair at the end of a line, and "linear whitespace" in header values.

=== Command-line parsing ===
Typical command-line parsers use the space character to delimit arguments. A value with an embedded space character is problematic since it causes the value to parse as multiple arguments. Typically, a parser allows for escaping the normal argument parsing by enclosing the text in quotes.

If, for example, a user wanted to view the contents of a directory named foo bar by using the ls (list) command, and they did so by entering the command as:

ls foo bar

the command would, instead, attempt to list files or directories named foo and bar. The correct syntax would specify only a single argument by enclosing it in double quotes:

ls "foo bar"

Or, alternatively, they could choose to leave out the double quotes and instead escape the space with a backslash:

ls foo\ bar

=== Markup languages ===
Some markup languages, such as SGML, preserve whitespace as written.

Web markup languages such as XML and HTML treat whitespace characters specially, including space characters, for programmers' convenience. One or more space characters read by conforming display-time processors of those markup languages are collapsed to 0 or 1 space, depending on their semantic context. For example, double (or more) spaces within text are collapsed to a single space, and spaces which appear on either side of the "=" that separates an attribute name from its value have no effect on the interpretation of the document. Element end tags can contain trailing spaces, and empty-element tags in XML can contain spaces before the "/>". In these languages, unnecessary whitespace increases the file size, and so may slow network transfers. On the other hand, unnecessary whitespace can also inconspicuously mark code for identification purposes, in a manner similar to but less overtly obvious than the way comments in code can. This can be of benefit in proving an infringement of license or copyright claim if the code was blatantly copied and pasted.

==== Preserving whitespace ====
In XML attribute values, sequences of whitespace characters are treated as a single space when the document is read by a parser. Whitespace in XML element content is not changed in this way by the parser, but an application receiving information from the parser may choose to apply similar rules to element content. An XML document author can use the xml:space="preserve" attribute on an element to instruct the parser to discourage the downstream application from altering whitespace in that element's content.

In most HTML elements, a sequence of whitespace characters is treated as a single inter-word separator, which may manifest as a single space character when rendering text in a language that normally inserts such space between words. Conforming HTML renderers apply literal whitespace behaviour to certain elements: those inside <pre>...</pre> tags, and those where CSS property white-space is set to pre or pre-wrap. In these elements, space characters will not be "collapsed" into inter-word separators.

In MediaWiki markup, as well as the <pre>...</pre> there is an optional <poem>...</poem> tag, which also preserves whitespace. It requires Extension:Poem.

In both XML and HTML, the non-breaking space character, along with other "non-standard" spaces, is not treated as collapsible whitespace.

=== File names ===
Such usage is similar to multiword file names written for operating systems and applications that are confused by embedded space codes—such file names instead use an underscore (_) as a word separator, as_in_this_phrase.

Another such symbol is U+2422 ␢ BLANK SYMBOL, which was used on coding forms in the early years of computer programming. Keypunch operators interpreted it as an "explicit space". It was used in BCDIC, EBCDIC, and ASCII-1963.

== See also ==
- Carriage return
- Em (typography)
- En (typography)
- Form feed
- Indent style
- Line feed
- Newline
- Programming style
- Prosigns for Morse code
- Regular expression § Character classes for the white-space character class.
- Space bar
- Space (punctuation)
- Tab key
- Trimming (computer programming)
- Whitespace (programming language)
- Zero-width space
