= Protoscholastic writing =

Development in western orthography

Protoscholastic writing refers to the period in the Middle Ages when writing styles changed from liturgical models, mere adjuncts to the recitation of prayer, to a more complex form. Effectively it re-introduced the space between words in religious texts, especially on the Continent. Prior to that, words were all run together in Latin without separation. The change began in the 7th century, and by the 14th century, the protoscholastic model was the standard. It was introduced to make texts for scholars easier to read and comprehend, a necessary function for the more technical concepts introduced by Aristotle. Peter Abelard was a noted exponent of this new style.
