= Mac OS Armenian =

Apple computer text character encoding

- Language: Armenian
- Created by: Evertype
- Classification: Extended ASCII
- Extends: US-ASCII

Mac OS Armenian is an Armenian character encoding for Mac OS created by Michael Everson for use in his fonts. It is not an official Mac OS character set.

== Layout ==
Each character is shown with its equivalent Unicode code point. Only the second half of the table (code points 128–255) is shown, the first half (code points 0–127) being the same as ASCII.

Mac OS Armenian
	0	1	2	3	4	5	6	7	8	9	A	B	C	D	E	F
8x	Ա	Բ	Գ	Դ	Ե	Զ	Է	Ը	Թ	Ժ	Ի	Լ	Խ	Ծ	Կ	Հ
9x	Ձ	Ղ	Ճ	Մ	Յ	Ն	Շ	Ո	Չ	Պ	Ջ	Ռ	Ս	Վ	Տ	Ր
Ax	†	°	¢	£	§	•	¶	և	®	©	™	՛	՝	≠	՚	Ւ
Bx	∞	±	≤	≥	¥	µ	∂	∑	Օ	օ	Ֆ	ֆ	❀	Ω	π	ւ
Cx	՞	՜	¬	√	ƒ	≈	∆	«	»	…	NBSP	Ց	ց	՟	Փ	փ
Dx	–	—	“	”	‘	’	÷	„	Ք	ք	★	€	‹	›	№	ր
Ex	ա	բ	գ	դ	ե	զ	է	ը	թ	ժ	ի	լ	խ	ծ	կ	հ
Fx	ձ	ղ	ճ	մ	յ	ն	շ	ո	չ	պ	ջ	ռ	ս	վ	տ	։
