= Unicode space =

Unicode space may refer to

- Unicode space characters
- Plane (Unicode), code space for characters
