= Hyphen =

Punctuation mark used to join words

‐o

Hyphen
- In Unicode: U+002D - HYPHEN-MINUS; U+00AD SOFT HYPHEN; U+2010 ‐ HYPHEN; U+2011 ‑ NON-BREAKING HYPHEN

Different from
- Different from: U+2212 − MINUS SIGN; U+2012 ‒ FIGURE DASH; U+2013 – EN DASH; U+2014 — EM DASH

The hyphen ‐ is a punctuation mark used to join words and to separate syllables of a single word. The use of hyphens is called hyphenation.

The hyphen is sometimes confused with dashes (en dash –, em dash — and others), which are wider, or with the minus sign −, which is also wider and usually drawn a little higher to match the crossbar in the plus sign +.

As an orthographic concept, the hyphen is a single entity. In character encoding for use with computers, it is represented in Unicode by any of several characters. These include the dual-use hyphen-minus, the soft hyphen, the nonbreaking hyphen, and an unambiguous form known familiarly as the "Unicode hyphen", shown at the top of the infobox on this page. The character most often used to represent a hyphen (and the one produced by the key on a keyboard) is called the "hyphen-minus" in the Unicode specification because it is also used as a minus sign. The name derives from its name in the original ASCII standard, where it was called "hyphen (minus)".

== Etymology ==
The word is derived from Ancient Greek ὑφ’ ἕν (huph’ hén), syncopated from ὑπὸ ἕν (hypó hén), "in one" (literally "under one"). An (ἡ) ὑφέν ((hē) hyphén) was an undertie-like ‿ sign written below two adjacent letters to indicate that they belong to the same word when it was necessary to avoid ambiguity, before word spacing was practiced.

== History ==
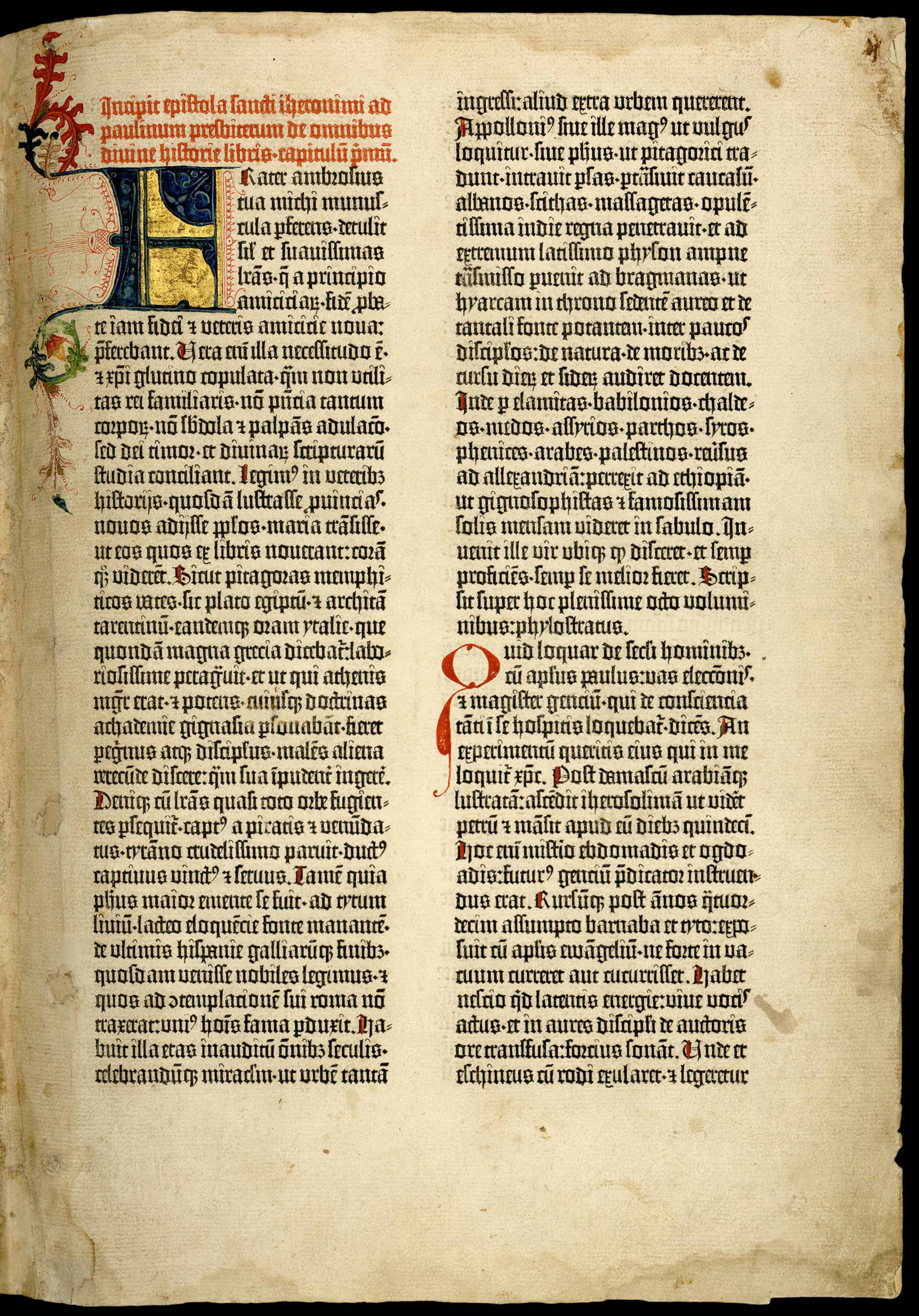
First page of the first volume: the epistle of St Jerome to Paulinus from the University of Texas copy. The page has 40 lines.

The first known documentation of the hyphen is in the grammatical works of Dionysius Thrax. At the time, hyphenation was joining two pieces of text that might otherwise be read as two separate words by a low tie mark. This was necessary due to the ambiguity inherent in the lack of word spacing. In Greek these marks were known as enotikon, officially romanized as a hyphen.

With the introduction of word spacing in the Middle Ages, the hyphen, still written beneath the text, was used to connect two words that had been incorrectly separated by a space. With word spacing in play, omitting a space is essentially the same function as supplying an enotikon, rendering the enotikon unnecessary. This, plus the extra difficulty of using an enotikon in the closely-spaced lines of movable type, caused the greek-style hyphen to fall by the wayside.

The Middle Ages also saw the introduction of the marginal hyphen, for words broken across lines, and also the compound-word hyphen, for forming hyphenated compounds. It is unclear, and a matter of scholarly debate, whether the compound-word hyphen came from the marginal hyphen or vice versa.

Johannes Gutenberg, in the publication of his famous 42-line Gutenberg Bible, heralding the age of movable type, used ⸗, "common to blackletter texts of the time", as the form of his hyphen. The Gutenberg Bible is noted for its perfect justification and regular spacing, which it achieves in part by hyphenating words without any additional rules that would constrain it from placing a hyphen anywhere in a word.

== Use in English ==
The English language does not have definitive hyphenation rules, though various style guides provide detailed usage recommendations and have a significant amount of overlap in what they advise. Hyphens are mostly used to break single words into parts or to join ordinarily separate words into single words. Spaces are not placed between a hyphen and either of the elements it connects except when using a suspended or "hanging" hyphen that stands in for a repeated word (e.g., nineteenth- and twentieth-century writers). Style conventions that apply to hyphens (and dashes) have evolved to support ease of reading in complex constructions; editors often accept deviations if they aid rather than hinder easy comprehension.

The use of the hyphen in English compound nouns and verbs has, in general, been steadily declining. Compounds that might once have been hyphenated are increasingly left with spaces or are combined into one word. Reflecting this changing usage, in 2007, the sixth edition of the Shorter Oxford English Dictionary removed the hyphens from 16,000 entries, such as fig-leaf (now fig leaf), pot-belly (now pot belly), and pigeon-hole (now pigeonhole). The increasing prevalence of computer technology and the advent of the Internet have given rise to a subset of common nouns that might have been hyphenated in the past (e.g., toolbar, hyperlink, and pastebin).

Despite decreased use, hyphenation remains the norm in certain compound-modifier constructions and, among some authors, with certain prefixes (see below). Hyphenation is also routinely used as part of syllabification in justified texts to avoid unsightly spacing (especially in columns with narrow line lengths, as when used with newspapers).

=== Separating ===
==== Justification and line-wrapping ====
When flowing text, it is sometimes preferable to break a word into two so that it continues on another line rather than moving the entire word to the next line. The word may be divided at the nearest break point between syllables (syllabification) and a hyphen inserted to indicate that the letters form a word fragment, rather than a full word. This allows more efficient use of paper, allows flush appearance of right-side margins (justification) without oddly large word spaces, and decreases the problem of rivers. This kind of hyphenation is most useful when the width of the column (called the "line length" in typography) is very narrow. For example:

Justified text
without hyphenation

We, therefore, the
representatives of the United
States of America ...

Justified text
with hyphenation

We, therefore, the represen-
tatives of the United States
of America ...

Rules (or guidelines) for correct hyphenation vary between languages, and may be complex, and they can interact with other orthographic and typesetting practices. Hyphenation algorithms, when employed in concert with dictionaries, are sufficient for all but the most formal texts.

It may be necessary to distinguish an incidental line-break hyphen from one integral to a word being mentioned (as when used in a dictionary) or present in an original text being quoted (when in a critical edition), not only to control its word wrap behavior (which encoding handles with hard and soft hyphens having the same glyph) but also to differentiate appearance (with a different glyph). Webster's Third New International Dictionary and the Chambers Dictionary use a double hyphen for integral hyphens and a single hyphen for line-breaks, whereas Kromhout's Afrikaans–English dictionary uses the opposite convention. The Concise Oxford Dictionary (fifth edition) suggested repeating an integral hyphen at the start of the following line.

==== Prefixes and suffixes ====
Prefixes (such as de-, pre-, re-, and non-) and suffixes (such as -less, -like, -ness, and -hood) are sometimes hyphenated, especially when the unhyphenated spelling resembles another word or when the affixation is deemed misinterpretable, ambiguous, or somehow "odd-looking" (for example, having two consecutive monographs that look like the digraphs of English, like e+a, e+e, or e+i). However, the unhyphenated style, which is also called closed up or solid, is usually preferred, particularly when the derivative has been relatively familiarized or popularized through extensive use in various contexts. As a rule of thumb, affixes are not hyphenated unless the lack of a hyphen would hurt clarity.

The hyphen may be used between vowel letters (e.g., ee, ea, ei) to indicate that they do not form a digraph. Some words have both hyphenated and unhyphenated variants: de-escalate/deescalate, co-operation/cooperation, re-examine/reexamine, de-emphasize/deemphasize, and so on. Words often lose their hyphen as they become more common, such as email instead of e-mail. When there are tripled letters, the hyphenated variant of these words is often more common (as in shell-like instead of shelllike).

Closed-up style is avoided in some cases: possible homographs, such as recreation (fun or sport) versus re-creation (the act of creating again), retreat (turn back) versus re-treat (give therapy again), and un-ionized (not in ion form) versus unionized (organized into trade unions); combinations with proper nouns or adjectives (un-American, de-Stalinisation); acronyms (anti-TNF antibody, non-SI units); or numbers (pre-1949 diplomacy, pre-1492 cartography). Although proto-oncogene is still hyphenated by both Dorland's and Merriam-Webster's Medical, the solid (that is, unhyphenated) styling (protooncogene) is a common variant, particularly among oncologists and geneticists.

A diaeresis may also be used in a like fashion, either to separate and mark off monographs (as in coöperation) or to signalize a vocalic terminal e (for example, Brontë). This use of the diaeresis peaked in the late 19th and early 20th centuries, but it was never applied extensively across the language: only a handful of diaereses, including coöperation and Brontë, are encountered with any appreciable frequency in English; thus reëxamine, reïterate, deëmphasize, etc. are seldom encountered. In borrowings from Modern French, whose orthography utilizes the diaeresis as a means to differentiate graphemes, various English dictionaries list the dieresis as optional (as in naive and naïve) despite the juxtaposition of a and i.

==== Syllabification and spelling ====
Hyphens are occasionally used to denote syllabification, as in syl-la-bi-fi-ca-tion. (Similar to a hyphenation point.)

Similarly, hyphens may be used to indicate the spelling of a word, as in W-O-R-D to represent word.

In the 19th and early 20th centuries hyphens were also sometimes used to divide syllables in words from indigenous North American languages being transcribed into the Latin script, such as "Shuh-shuh-gah" (from Ojibwe zhashagi, "blue heron") in The Song of Hiawatha. Other styles of transcription, in use before and after this one, did not use hyphens this way. As the hyphenation is "usually syllable-by-syllable but sometimes not", it is difficult to ascertain if this was intended to communicate morphological information or "some perceived difference in prosody". John Wesley Powell's Introduction to the Study of Indian Languages from 1880 explicitly instructs this method of transcription for the documentation of American Indian languages: "Syllables should be separated by hyphens. In connected texts hyphens should be omitted." This somewhat archaic hyphenation style can still be found preserved in some contemporary place names such as that of Ah-gwah-ching, Minnesota.

=== Joining ===
==== Compound modifiers ====
Compound modifiers are groups of two or more words that jointly modify the meaning of another word. When a compound modifier other than an adverb–adjective combination appears before a term, the compound modifier is often hyphenated to prevent misunderstanding, such as in American-football player or little-celebrated paintings. Without the hyphen, there is potential confusion about whether the writer means a "player of American football" or an "American player of football" and whether the writer means paintings that are "little celebrated" or "celebrated paintings" that are little. Compound modifiers can extend to three or more words, as in ice-cream-flavored candy, and can be adverbial as well as adjectival (spine-tinglingly frightening). However, if the compound is a familiar one, it is usually unhyphenated. For example, some style guides prefer the construction high school students, to high-school students. Although the expression is technically ambiguous ("students of a high school"/"school students who are high"), it would normally be formulated differently if other than the first meaning were intended. Noun–noun compound modifiers may also be written without a hyphen when no confusion is likely: grade point average and department store manager.

When a compound modifier follows the term to which it applies, a hyphen is typically not used if the compound is a temporary compound. For example, "that gentleman is well respected", not "that gentleman is well-respected"; or "a patient-centered approach was used" but "the approach was patient centered." But permanent compounds, found as headwords in dictionaries, are treated as invariable, so if they are hyphenated in the cited dictionary, the hyphenation will be used in both attributive and predicative positions. For example, "A cost-effective method was used" and "The method was cost-effective" (cost-effective is a permanent compound that is hyphenated as a headword in various dictionaries). When one of the parts of the modifier is a proper noun or a proper adjective, there is no hyphen (e.g., "a South American actor").

When the first modifier in a compound is an adverb ending in -ly (e.g., "a poorly written novel"), various style guides advise no hyphen. However, some do allow for this use. For example, The Economist Style Guide advises: "Adverbs do not need to be linked to participles or adjectives by hyphens in simple constructions ... Less common adverbs, including all those that end -ly, are less likely to need hyphens." In the 19th century, it was common to hyphenate adverb–adjective modifiers with the adverb ending in -ly (e.g., "a craftily-constructed chair"). However, this has become rare. For example, wholly owned subsidiary and quickly moving vehicle are unambiguous, because the adverbs clearly modify the adjectives: "quickly" cannot modify "vehicle".

However, if an adverb can also function as an adjective, then a hyphen may be or should be used for clarity, depending on the style guide. For example, the phrase more-important reasons ("reasons that are more important") is distinguished from more important reasons ("additional important reasons"), where more is an adjective. Similarly, more-beautiful scenery (with a mass-noun) is distinct from more beautiful scenery. (In contrast, the hyphen in "a more-important reason" is not necessary, because the syntax cannot be misinterpreted.) A few short and common words—such as well, ill, little, and much—attract special attention in this category. The hyphen in "well-[past_participled] noun", such as in "well-differentiated cells", might reasonably be judged superfluous (the syntax is unlikely to be misinterpreted), yet plenty of style guides call for it. Because early has both adverbial and adjectival senses, its hyphenation can attract attention; some editors, due to comparison with advanced-stage disease and adult-onset disease, like the parallelism of early-stage disease and early-onset disease. Similarly, the hyphen in little-celebrated paintings clarifies that one is not speaking of little paintings.

Hyphens are usually used to connect numbers and words in modifying phrases. Such is the case when used to describe dimensional measurements of weight, size, and time, under the rationale that, like other compound modifiers, they take hyphens in attributive position (before the modified noun), although not in predicative position (after the modified noun). This is applied whether numerals or words are used for the numbers. Thus 28-year-old woman and twenty-eight-year-old woman or 32-foot wingspan and thirty-two-foot wingspan, but the woman is 28 years old and a wingspan of 32 feet. (Note: With numbers, where a plural noun would normally be used in an unhyphenated predicative position, the singular form of the noun is generally used in the hyphenated form used attributively. Thus a woman who is 28 years old becomes a 28-year-old woman. There are occasional exceptions to this general rule, for instance with fractions (a two-thirds majority) and irregular plurals (a two-criteria review, a two-teeth bridge).) However, with symbols for SI units (such as m or kg)—in contrast to the names of these units (such as metre or kilogram)—the numerical value is always separated from it with a space: a 25 kg sphere. When the unit names are spelled out, this recommendation does not apply: a 25-kilogram sphere, a roll of 35-millimetre film.

In spelled-out fractions, hyphens are usually used when the fraction is used as an adjective but not when it is used as a noun: thus two-thirds majority and one-eighth portion but I drank two thirds of the bottle or I kept three quarters of it for myself. However, at least one major style guide hyphenates spelled-out fractions invariably (whether adjective or noun).

In English, an en dash, –, sometimes replaces the hyphen in hyphenated compounds if either of its constituent parts is already hyphenated or contains a space (for example, San Francisco–area residents, hormone receptor–positive cells, cell cycle–related factors, and public-school–private-school rivalries). A commonly used alternative style is the hyphenated string (hormone-receptor-positive cells, cell-cycle-related factors). (For other aspects of en dash–versus–hyphen use, see Dash § En dash.)

==== Object–verbal-noun compounds ====
When an object is compounded with a verbal noun, such as egg-beater (a tool that beats eggs), the result is sometimes hyphenated. Some authors do this consistently, others only for disambiguation; in this case, egg-beater, egg beater, and eggbeater are all common.

An example of an ambiguous phrase appears in they stood near a group of alien lovers, which without a hyphen implies that they stood near a group of lovers who were aliens; they stood near a group of alien-lovers clarifies that they stood near a group of people who loved aliens, as "alien" can be either an adjective or a noun. On the other hand, in the phrase a hungry pizza-lover, the hyphen will often be omitted (a hungry pizza lover), as "pizza" cannot be an adjective and the phrase is therefore unambiguous.

Similarly, a man-eating shark is nearly the opposite of a man eating shark; the first refers to a shark that eats people, and the second to a man who eats shark meat. A government-monitoring program is a program that monitors the government, whereas a government monitoring program is a government program that monitors something else.

==== Personal names ====
Some married couples compose a new surname (sometimes referred to as a double-barrelled name) for their new family by combining their two surnames with a hyphen. Jane Doe and John Smith might become Jane and John Smith-Doe, or Doe-Smith, for instance. In some countries only the woman hyphenates her birth surname, appending her husband's surname.

With already-hyphenated names, some parts are typically dropped. For example, Aaron Johnson and Samantha Taylor-Wood became Aaron Taylor-Johnson and Sam Taylor-Johnson. Not all hyphenated surnames are the result of marriage. For example Julia Louis-Dreyfus is a descendant of Louis Lemlé Dreyfus whose son was Léopold Louis-Dreyfus.

Hyphens are often used in romanization of Korean names, such as Ban Ki-moon and Cho Jung-ho.

==== Other compounds ====
Connecting hyphens are used in a large number of miscellaneous compounds, other than modifiers, such as in lily-of-the-valley, cock-a-hoop, clever-clever, tittle-tattle and orang-utan. Use is often dictated by convention rather than fixed rules, and hyphenation styles may vary between authors; for example, orang-utan is also written as orangutan or orang utan, and lily-of-the-valley may be hyphenated or not.

==== Suspended hyphens ====
A suspended hyphen (also called a suspensive hyphen or hanging hyphen, or less commonly a dangling or floating hyphen) may be used when a single base word is used with separate, consecutive, hyphenated words that are connected by "and", "or", or "to". For example, short-term and long-term plans may be written as short- and long-term plans. This usage is now common and specifically recommended in some style guides. Suspended hyphens are also used, though less commonly, when the base word comes first, such as in "investor-owned and -operated". Uses such as "applied and sociolinguistics" (instead of "applied linguistics and sociolinguistics") are frowned upon; the Indiana University style guide uses this example and says "Do not 'take a shortcut' when the first expression is ordinarily open" (i.e., ordinarily two separate words). This is different, however, from instances where prefixes that are normally closed up (styled solidly) are used suspensively. For example, preoperative and postoperative becomes pre- and postoperative (not pre- and post-operative) when suspended. Some editors prefer to avoid suspending such pairs, choosing instead to write out both words in full.

=== Other uses ===
A hyphen may be used to connect groups of numbers, such as in dates (see § Usage in date notation), telephone numbers or sports scores.

It can also be used to indicate a range of values, although many styles prefer an en dash (see Dash § En dash §§ Ranges of values).

It is sometimes used to hide letters in words (filleting for redaction or censoring), as in "G-d", although an en dash can be used as well ("G–d").

It is often used in reduplication.

Due to their similar appearances, hyphens are sometimes mistakenly used where an en dash or em dash would be more appropriate.

=== Varied meanings ===
Some stark examples of semantic changes caused by the placement of hyphens to mark attributive phrases:

- Disease-causing poor nutrition is poor nutrition that causes disease.
  - Disease causing poor nutrition is a disease that causes poor nutrition.
- A hard-working man is a man who works hard.
  - A hard working man is a working man who is tough; however, this sense of hard is rarely used before other adjectives.
- A man-eating shark is a shark that eats humans.
  - A man eating shark is a man who is eating shark meat.
- Three-hundred-year-old trees are an indeterminate number of trees that are each 300 years old.
  - Three hundred-year-old trees are three trees that are each 100 years old.
  - Three hundred year-old trees are 300 trees that are each a year old.

== Use in computing ==
=== Hyphen-minuses ===
In the ASCII character encoding, the hyphen (or minus) is character 45_{10}. As Unicode is identical to ASCII (the 1967 version) for all encodings up to 127_{10}, the number 45_{10} (2D_{16}) is also assigned to this character in Unicode, where it is denoted as U+002D - HYPHEN-MINUS. Unicode has, in addition, other encodings for minus and hyphen characters: U+2212 − MINUS SIGN and U+2010 ‐ HYPHEN, respectively. The unambiguous § "Unicode hyphen" at U+2010 is generally inconvenient to enter on most keyboards and the glyphs for this hyphen and the hyphen-minus are identical in most fonts (Lucida Sans Unicode is one of the few exceptions). Consequently, use of the hyphen-minus as the hyphen character is very common. Even the Unicode Standard regularly uses the hyphen-minus rather than the U+2010 hyphen.

The hyphen-minus has limited use in indicating subtraction; for example, compare 4+3−2=5 (minus) and 4+3-2=5 (hyphen-minus) — in most typefaces, the glyph for hyphen-minus will not have the optimal width, thickness, or vertical position, whereas the minus character is typically designed so that it does. Nevertheless, in many spreadsheet and programming applications the hyphen-minus must be typed to indicate subtraction, as use of the Unicode minus sign will not be recognised.

The hyphen-minus is often used instead of dashes or minus signs in situations where the latter characters are unavailable (such as type-written or ASCII-only text), where they take effort to enter (via dialog boxes or multi-key keyboard shortcuts), or when the writer is unaware of the distinction. Consequently, some writers use two or three hyphen-minuses (-- or ---) to represent an em dash. In the TeX typesetting languages, a single hyphen-minus (-) renders a hyphen, a single hyphen-minus in math mode ($-$) renders a minus sign, two hyphen-minuses (--) renders an en dash, and three hyphen-minuses (---) renders an em dash.

The hyphen-minus character is also often used when specifying command-line options. The character is usually followed by one or more letters that indicate specific actions. Typically it is called a dash or switch in this context. Various implementations of the getopt function to parse command-line options additionally allow the use of two hyphen-minus characters, --, to specify long option names that are more descriptive than their single-letter equivalents. Another use of hyphens is that employed by programs written with pipelining in mind: a single hyphen may be recognized in lieu of a filename, with the hyphen then serving as an indicator that a standard stream, instead of a file, is to be worked with.

=== Soft and hard hyphens ===
Although software (hyphenation algorithms) can often automatically make decisions on when to hyphenate a word at a line break, it is also sometimes useful for the user to be able to insert cues for those decisions (which are dynamic in the online medium, given that text can be reflowed). For this purpose, the concept of a soft hyphen (discretionary hyphen, optional hyphen) was introduced, allowing such manual specification of a place where a hyphenated break is allowed but not forced. That is, it does not force a line break in an inconvenient place when the text is later reflowed.

Soft hyphens are inserted into the text at the positions where hyphenation may occur. It can be a tedious task to insert the soft hyphens by hand, and tools using hyphenation algorithms are available that do this automatically. Current modules of the Cascading Style Sheets (CSS) standard provide language-specific hyphenation dictionaries.

In contrast, a hyphen that is always displayed and printed is called a "hard hyphen". This can be a Unicode hyphen, a hyphen-minus, or a nonbreaking hyphen (see below). Confusingly, the term is sometimes limited to nonbreaking hyphens.

=== Nonbreaking hyphens ===
The word segmentation rules of most text systems consider a hyphen to be a word boundary and a valid point at which to break a line when flowing text. This is not always desirable; it could lead to ambiguity (e.g. retreat and re‑treat would be indistinguishable with a line break after re), it can split off an ending as in "n‑th" (though n^{th} or "nth" could be used), and it is inappropriate in some languages other than English (e.g., a line break at the hyphen in Irish an t‑athair or Romanian s‑a would be undesirable). The non-breaking hyphen, nonbreaking hyphen, or no-break hyphen looks identical to the regular hyphen but word processors do not break words at it. The nonbreaking space exists for similar reasons.

=== "Unicode hyphen" ===
Because the conventional hyphen-minus mark on keyboards is ambiguous (it can be interpreted – sometimes unexpectedly – as a hyphen or a minus, depending on context), the Unicode consortium allocated codepoints for an unambiguous minus and an unambiguous hyphen. The Unicode hyphen (U+2010 ‐ HYPHEN) is seldom used. Even the Unicode Standard uses U+002D instead of U+2010 in its text.

== Use in date notation ==
Use of hyphens to delineate the parts of a written date (rather than the slashes used conventionally in Anglophone countries) is specified in the international standard ISO 8601. Thus, for example, 1789-07-14 is the standard way of writing the date of Bastille Day. This standard has been transposed as European Standard EN 28601 and has been incorporated into various national typographic style guides (e.g., DIN 5008 in Germany). Now all official European Union (and many member state) documents use this style. This is also the typical date format used in large parts of Europe and Asia, although sometimes with other separators than the hyphen.

This method has gained influence within North America, as most common computer file systems make the use of slashes in file names difficult or impossible. MS-DOS, OS/2 and Windows use / to introduce and separate switches to shell commands, and on both Windows and Unix-like systems slashes in a filename introduce subdirectories which may not be desirable. Besides encouraging use of dashes, the Y-M-D order and zero-padding of numbers less than 10 are also copied from ISO 8601 to make the filenames sort by date order.

== Unicode ==
Unicode has multiple hyphen characters:

- U+002D - HYPHEN-MINUS, a character of multiple uses
- U+00AD SOFT HYPHEN (&shy;) (Note: The soft hyphen serves as an invisible marker that is used to specify a place in text where a hyphenated line break is preferred should one be needed. This avoids forcing a line break in an inconvenient place, should the text be reflowed. It becomes visible only if word wrapping occurs at the end of a line.)
- U+2010 ‐ HYPHEN (&dash;, &hyphen;)
- U+2011 ‑ NON-BREAKING HYPHEN
- U+2E5D ⹝ OBLIQUE HYPHEN for medieval texts

And in non-Latin scripts:

- U+058A ֊ ARMENIAN HYPHEN
- U+05BE ־ HEBREW PUNCTUATION MAQAF
- U+1806 ᠆ MONGOLIAN TODO SOFT HYPHEN
- U+1B60 ᭠ BALINESE PAMENENG (used only as a line-breaking hyphen)
- U+2E17 ⸗ DOUBLE OBLIQUE HYPHEN (used in ancient Near-Eastern linguistics and in blackletter typefaces)
- U+30FB ・ KATAKANA MIDDLE DOT (has the Unicode property of "Hyphen" despite its name)
- U+FE63 ﹣ SMALL HYPHEN-MINUS (compatibility character for a small hyphen-minus, used in East Asian typography)
- U+FF0D － FULLWIDTH HYPHEN-MINUS (compatibility character for a wide hyphen-minus, used in East Asian typography)
- U+FF65 ･ HALFWIDTH KATAKANA MIDDLE DOT (compatibility character for a wide katakana middle dot, has the Unicode property of "Hyphen" despite its name)

Unicode distinguishes the hyphen from the general interpunct. The characters below do not have the Unicode property of "Hyphen" despite their names:

- U+1400 ᐀ CANADIAN SYLLABICS HYPHEN
- U+2027 ‧ HYPHENATION POINT
- U+2043 ⁃ HYPHEN BULLET (&hybull;)
- U+2E1A ⸚ HYPHEN WITH DIAERESIS
- U+2E40 ⹀ DOUBLE HYPHEN
- U+30A0 ゠ KATAKANA-HIRAGANA DOUBLE HYPHEN
- U+10EAD 𐺭 YEZIDI HYPHENATION MARK
- U+10D6E 𐵮 GARAY HYPHEN

(See interpunct and bullet (typography) for more round characters.)

== See also ==
- De-hyphenation – Concept in international relations
- Double hyphen – Historic punctuation mark (⹀)
- French orthography § Hyphens – Spelling and punctuation of the French language
- Hyphen War – Dispute over Czechoslovakia name after 1989
- Greek hyphen – Form of hyphen used in ancient Greek ("Papyrological hyphen")
- Enhypen – South Korean boy band, whose name refers to the hyphen
