= Input Field Separators =

For many command line interpreters (“shell”) of Unix operating systems, the input field separators or internal field separators or $IFS shell variable holds characters used to separate text into tokens.

The value of IFS, (in the bash shell) typically includes the space, tab, and the newline characters by default. These whitespace characters can be visualized by issuing the "declare" command in the bash shell or printing IFS with commands like printf %s "$IFS" | od -c, printf "%q\n" "$IFS" or printf %s "$IFS" | cat -A (the latter two commands being only available in some shells and on some systems).

From the Bash, version 4 man page:

The shell treats each character of $IFS as a delimiter, and splits the results of the other expansions into words on these characters. If IFS is unset, or its value is exactly <space><tab><newline>, the default, then sequences of <space>, <tab>, and <newline> at the beginning and end of the results of the previous expansions are ignored, and any sequence of IFS characters not at the beginning or end serves to delimit words. If IFS has a value other than the default, then sequences of the whitespace characters space and tab are ignored at the beginning and end of the word, as long as the whitespace character is in the value of IFS (an IFS whitespace character). Any character in IFS that is not IFS whitespace, along with any adjacent IFS whitespace characters, delimits a field. A sequence of IFS whitespace characters is also treated as a delimiter. If the value of IFS is null, no word splitting occurs.

== IFS abbreviation ==
According to the Open Group Base Specifications, IFS is an abbreviation for "input field separators." A newer version of this specification mentions that "this name is misleading as the IFS characters are actually used as field terminators." However IFS is often referred to as "internal field separators."

== Exploits ==
IFS was usable as an exploit in some versions of Unix. A program with root permissions could be fooled into executing user-supplied code if it ran (for instance) system("/bin/mail") and was called with $IFS set to "/", in which case it would run the program "bin" (in the current directory and thus writable by the user) with root permissions. This has been fixed by making the shells not inherit the IFS variable.
