= En (typography) =

Typographic unit equal to half an em

An en (from English en quadrat) is a typographic unit, half of the width of an em. By definition, it is equivalent to half of the body height of the typeface (e.g., in 16-point type it is 8 points). The en is sometimes referred to as the "nut", to avoid confusion with the similar-sounding "em".

The en dash (–) and en space ( ) are each one en wide. In English, the en dash is commonly used for inclusive ranges (e.g., "pages 12–17" or "August 7, 1988 – November 26, 2005"), to connect prefixes to open compounds (e.g., "pre–World War II").

The en-dash is also increasingly used to replace the long dash—also called an em dash or em rule. When using it to replace a long dash, spaces are needed either side of it – like so. This is standard practice in the German language, where the hyphen is the only dash without spaces on either side (line breaks are not spaces per se).

== History ==
Some sources claim the term "en" was derived from the letter "n", which is roughly half the width of the letter "m". This etymology, however, is disputed.

Beginning in the late 18th century, compositors were frequently paid by the en, rather than by the page. In the United Kingdom, a commonly cited "standard" rate was 1,000 ens per hour, although actual compositors' output varied widely. Many workers fell short of this figure, while skilled workers were known to set 2,000–3,000 ens per hour, and late-1900s typesetting competitions often saw participants reach a corrected rate of 4,000 ens per hour. After the introduction of the Linotype typesetters frequently reached rates of at least 6,000 ens per hour.

== Associated symbols ==
- en space: U+2002 EN SPACE (&ensp; · &#8194; · &#x2002;)
- en dash: U+2013 – EN DASH (&ndash; · &#8211; · &#x2013;)

== See also ==
- Non-breaking space width variations
- Standard typographic symbols
- x-height
