= Arabic Presentation Forms-B =

Unicode character block

- Range: U+FE70..U+FEFF (144 code points)
- Plane: BMP
- Scripts: Arabic (140 char.); Common (1 char.)
- Symbol sets: contextual and isolate forms of Arabic letters and points
- Assigned: 141 code points
- Unused: 3 reserved code points

Unicode version history
- 1.0.0 (1991): 140 (+140)
- 3.2 (2002): 141 (+1)

Unicode documentation
- Code chart ∣ Web page
- Note: The characters in this block were re-ordered in Unicode 1.0.1, in the process of merging with ISO/IEC 10646.

Arabic Presentation Forms-B is a Unicode block encoding spacing forms of Arabic diacritics, and contextual letter forms. The special codepoint ZWNBSP (zero width no-break space) is also here, which is only meant for a byte order mark (that may precede text, Arabic or not, or be absent) The byte-order mark is very useful in detecting endianness in UTF-16, because when it is at the start of UTF-16 data and the interpreter reads the first character as the noncharacter U+FFFE (see Specials), the file is clearly interpreted with the wrong endianness. (Note: As the name suggests, it was also used to prohibit line breaks at its position, but this usage was deprecated in Unicode 3.2.) The block name in Unicode 1.0 was Basic Glyphs for Arabic Language; its characters were re-ordered in the process of merging with ISO 10646 in Unicode 1.0.1 and 1.1.

The presentation forms are present only for compatibility with older standards, and are not currently needed for coding text.

== Block ==
Arabic Presentation Forms-B^{[1]}^{[2]} Official Unicode Consortium code chart (PDF)
	0	1	2	3	4	5	6	7	8	9	A	B	C	D	E	F
U+FE7x	ﹰ	ﹱ	ﹲ	ﹳ	ﹴ		ﹶ	ﹷ	ﹸ	ﹹ	ﹺ	ﹻ	ﹼ	ﹽ	ﹾ	ﹿ
U+FE8x	ﺀ	ﺁ	ﺂ	ﺃ	ﺄ	ﺅ	ﺆ	ﺇ	ﺈ	ﺉ	ﺊ	ﺋ	ﺌ	ﺍ	ﺎ	ﺏ
U+FE9x	ﺐ	ﺑ	ﺒ	ﺓ	ﺔ	ﺕ	ﺖ	ﺗ	ﺘ	ﺙ	ﺚ	ﺛ	ﺜ	ﺝ	ﺞ	ﺟ
U+FEAx	ﺠ	ﺡ	ﺢ	ﺣ	ﺤ	ﺥ	ﺦ	ﺧ	ﺨ	ﺩ	ﺪ	ﺫ	ﺬ	ﺭ	ﺮ	ﺯ
U+FEBx	ﺰ	ﺱ	ﺲ	ﺳ	ﺴ	ﺵ	ﺶ	ﺷ	ﺸ	ﺹ	ﺺ	ﺻ	ﺼ	ﺽ	ﺾ	ﺿ
U+FECx	ﻀ	ﻁ	ﻂ	ﻃ	ﻄ	ﻅ	ﻆ	ﻇ	ﻈ	ﻉ	ﻊ	ﻋ	ﻌ	ﻍ	ﻎ	ﻏ
U+FEDx	ﻐ	ﻑ	ﻒ	ﻓ	ﻔ	ﻕ	ﻖ	ﻗ	ﻘ	ﻙ	ﻚ	ﻛ	ﻜ	ﻝ	ﻞ	ﻟ
U+FEEx	ﻠ	ﻡ	ﻢ	ﻣ	ﻤ	ﻥ	ﻦ	ﻧ	ﻨ	ﻩ	ﻪ	ﻫ	ﻬ	ﻭ	ﻮ	ﻯ
U+FEFx	ﻰ	ﻱ	ﻲ	ﻳ	ﻴ	ﻵ	ﻶ	ﻷ	ﻸ	ﻹ	ﻺ	ﻻ	ﻼ			ZW; NBSP
Notes 1.As of Unicode version 17.0 2.Grey areas indicate non-assigned code points

== History ==
The following Unicode-related documents record the purpose and process of defining specific characters in the Arabic Presentation Forms-B block:

Version	Final code points (Note: Proposed code points and characters names may differ from final code points and names)	Count	UTC ID	L2 ID	WG2 ID	Document
1.0.0	U+FE70..FE72, FE74, FE76..FE7F	14	UTC/1991-048B			Whistler, Ken (1991-03-27), "14 addtional [sic] Arabic spacing diacritics", Draft Minutes from the UTC meeting #46 day 2, 3/27 at Apple
1.0.0	U+FE80..FEFC	125				(to be determined)
1.0.0	U+FEFF	1	UTC/1991-054			Whistler, Ken, FF Proposal
1.0.0	U+FEFF	1	UTC/1991-048B			Whistler, Ken (1991-03-27), "III.I.4", Draft Minutes from the UTC meeting #46 day 2, 3/27 at Apple
1.0.0	U+FEFF	1		L2/05-137		Freytag, Asmus (2005-05-10), Handling "defective" names
1.0.0	U+FEFF	1		L2/05-108R		Moore, Lisa (2005-08-26), "Consensus 103-C7", UTC #103 Minutes, "Create a "Normative Name Alias" property and file in the UCD. Populate the property with names from the sections "Typos" and "Bad or misleading names" from document L2/05-137."
3.2	U+FE73	1		L2/01-069		Davis, Mark (2001-01-29), Proposal Summary Form for Arabic character tail for final Seen family (Seen, Sheen, Saad, Daad)
3.2	U+FE73	1		L2/01-095	N2322	Umamaheswaran, V. S. (2001-02-05), Proposal to add "Arabic Tail Fragment" character
3.2	U+FE73	1		L2/01-012R		Moore, Lisa (2001-05-21), "Motion 86-M30", Minutes UTC #86 in Mountain View, Jan 2001, "Accept the addition of the character ARABIC TAIL FRAGMENT at U+FE73, with the properties of an extender."
3.2	U+FE73	1		L2/01-344	N2353 (pdf, doc)	Umamaheswaran, V. S. (2001-09-09), "7.9", Minutes from SC2/WG2 meeting #40 -- Mountain View, April 2001
