= Thin space =

Space character about 1/5 em wide

Spacing examples. The top row is unspaced, the middle row has a thin space between the words, and the bottom has a regular space.

In typography, a thin space is a space character whose width is usually 1/5 or 1/6 of an em. It is used to add a narrow space, such as between nested quotation marks or to separate glyphs that interfere with one another. It is not as narrow as the hair space. It is also used in the International System of Units and in many countries as a thousands separator when writing numbers in groups of three digits, in order to facilitate reading. It also avoids the ambiguity of the comma, used as a thousands separator in many countries but as a decimal point in Europe.

In Unicode, thin space is encoded at U+2009 THIN SPACE (&thinsp;, &ThinSpace;). Some text editors, such as IntelliJ IDEA and Android Studio, will display the character as its suggested abbreviation of "THSP". Unicode's U+202F NARROW NO-BREAK SPACE is a non-breaking space with a width similar to that of the thin space.

In LaTeX and Plain TeX, \thinspace produces a narrow, non-breaking space. Inside and outside of math formulae in LaTeX, \, also produces a narrow, non-breaking space.

In all versions of LibreOffice and in some of Microsoft Word, the special characters and symbols dialog (often available via Insert > Symbol or Insert > Special Characters), has both the thin space and the narrow no-break space available for point-and-click insertion. In LibreOffice's Symbol dialog, there is an easy-to-find box field to narrow the searching; in Word's Symbol dialog, under font = "(normal text)", the characters are found in subset = "General Punctuation", Unicode character 2009 and nearby. Other word processing programs and many Linux configurations have ways of producing a thin space using keyboard shortcuts.

== See also ==
- Figure space
- Whitespace character for additional space characters of various widths
