= Fillet (redaction) =

Form of redaction using dashes within words

To fillet in the sense of literary editing is a form of censorship or redaction effected by "cutting out" central letters of a word or name, as if the skeleton of a fish, and replacing them with dashes, to prevent full disclosure (e.g. W——m P——t for "William Pitt"). It was frequently practiced in publications of the 18th century in England. Its purpose was to inform interested readers in an obfuscated manner whilst at the same time avoiding the risk of being sued for illegal publication or defamation or libel by the overt naming of persons as having committed certain acts or spoken certain words.

It was used in parliamentary reports published in The Gentleman's Magazine from 1738 onwards under the title of the "Debates in the Senate of Magna Lilliputia" in which in order to circumvent the prohibition of the publication of parliamentary debates of the English Parliament the real names of the various orators were filleted or replaced by pseudonyms or anagrams; for example, Sir Robert Walpole was thinly disguised as Sr. R——t W——le. The ban on parliamentary reporting was lifted in 1771.

It was often performed not to avoid legal action but merely to show deference to the privacy of some great personage, or not to offend his or her imputed sense of modesty by naming him or her as the author of some great or worthy deed or act.

== See also ==
- Blind item
- Ellipsis
- Naming taboo
