= Em (typography) =

Typographic unit equal to the point size

An em (from em quadrat) is a unit in the field of typography, equal to the currently specified point size. It corresponds to the body height of the typeface. For example, one em in a 16-point typeface is 16 points. Therefore, this unit is the same for all typefaces at a given point size.

The em space is one em wide.

Typographic measurements using this unit are frequently expressed in decimal notation (e.g., 0.7 em) or as fractions of 100 or 1000 (e.g., 70/100 em or 700/1000 em). The number of pixels per em varies depending on the system.

== History ==
A metal sort. The line height, c, is the precursor of the em.

In metal type, the point size (and hence the em, from em quadrat) was equal to the line height of the metal body from which the letter rises. In metal type, the physical size of a letter could not usually exceed the em.

A digital font's design space is called the em, a grid with arbitrary resolution. Imaging systems, whether for screen or print, work by scaling the em to a particular point size.

In digital type, the relationship of the height of particular letters to the em is arbitrarily set by the typeface designer. However, as a very rough guideline, an "average" font might have a cap height of 70% of the em, and an x-height of 48% of the em.

== Obsolete alternative definition ==
The letter M, on the left in Perpetua and on the right in Calisto, inside squares of one em on each side. The M in Perpetua does not match the point size of the em.

In some older texts, but not all, the em is defined, or said to have been defined, as the width of the capital 'M' in the current typeface and point size. Possibly this is because the 'M' sort in such cases cast the full-width of the quad (also known as em quad, mutton quad, or m quadrat); and thus, the width of the sort would equal its point size.

Note, however, that in the oldest attested English text from 1683 mentioning em (as m or m quadrat), this alternative definition is not used, and also not in many other older texts.

== CSS ==
In Cascading Style Sheets, the em unit is the height of the font in nominal points or inches. The actual, physical height of any given portion of the font depends on the user-defined DPI setting, current element font-size, and the particular font being used.

To make style rules that depend only on the default font size, another unit was developed: the rem. The rem «rem unit», or root-em, is the font size of the root element of the document. Unlike em, which may vary by element, rem is constant throughout the document.

== See also ==
- Centimetre (cm) – Unit of length
- Em dash (—)
- En (typography) – Typographic unit equal to half an em
- Halfwidth and fullwidth forms – Alternative width characters in East Asian typography
- List of XML and HTML character entity references
- Measurement (mm) – Process of assigning numbers to objects or events
- Micrometre (UM-μm) – Unit of length; one millionth of a metre
- Non-breaking space width variations
- Pica (pc) – Unit of length used in type design
- Pixel (px) – Smallest addressable element of a raster image
- Point (pt) – Measurement unit used in typography
- Responsive web design – Approach to web design for making web pages render well on a variety of devices
- Whitespace character – Computer text file character representing blank space
