= Zero-width space =

Special character in text processing

- In Unicode: U+200B ZERO WIDTH SPACE (&NegativeMediumSpace;, &NegativeThickSpace;, &NegativeThinSpace;, &NegativeVeryThinSpace;, &ZeroWidthSpace;)

Symbol for use on keyboards

The zero-width space (rendered:; HTML entity: &ZeroWidthSpace; or &#8203;), abbreviated ZWSP, is a non-printing character used in computerized typesetting to indicate where the word boundaries are, without actually displaying a visible space in the rendered text. This enables text-processing systems for scripts that do not use explicit spacing to recognize where word boundaries are for the purpose of handling line breaks appropriately.

The zero-width space is Unicode character U+200B, and is located in the Unicode General Punctuation block. In HTML, it can be represented by the character entity reference &ZeroWidthSpace;.

== Purpose ==
The zero-width space marks a potential line break without hyphenation. Its semantics and HTML implementation are similar to the soft hyphen, but soft hyphens display a hyphen character at the point where the line is broken.

The zero-width space can be used to mark word breaks in languages without visible space between words, such as Thai, Myanmar, Khmer, and Japanese.

In justified text, the rendering engine may add inter-character spacing, also known as letter spacing, between letters separated by a zero-width space, unlike around fixed-width spaces.

=== Example ===
To show the effect of the zero-width space in text, the following words have been separated with zero-width spaces:

LoremIpsumDolorSitAmetConsecteturAdipiscingElitSedDoEiusmodTemporIncididuntUtLaboreEtDoloreMagnaAliquaUtEnimAdMinimVeniamQuisNostrudExercitationUllamcoLaborisNisiUtAliquipExEaCommodoConsequatDuisAuteIrureDolorInReprehenderitInVoluptateVelitEsseCillumDoloreEuFugiatNullaPariaturExcepteurSintOccaecatCupidatatNonProidentSuntInCulpaQuiOfficiaDeseruntMollitAnimIdEstLaborum

By contrast, the following words have not been separated:

LoremIpsumDolorSitAmetConsecteturAdipiscingElitSedDoEiusmodTemporIncididuntUtLaboreEtDoloreMagnaAliquaUtEnimAdMinimVeniamQuisNostrudExercitationUllamcoLaborisNisiUtAliquipExEaCommodoConsequatDuisAuteIrureDolorInReprehenderitInVoluptateVelitEsseCillumDoloreEuFugiatNullaPariaturExcepteurSintOccaecatCupidatatNonProidentSuntInCulpaQuiOfficiaDeseruntMollitAnimIdEstLaborum

The first text is broken into lines but only at word boundaries, and resizing the browser window will re-break the text accordingly, while the second text is not broken at all.

== Usage ==
=== HTML ===
In HTML pages, the HTML element <wbr> functions as a zero-width space. In Internet Explorer 6, the zero-width space was not supported in some fonts.

=== Prohibition in domain names ===
ICANN rules prohibit domain names from containing non-displayed characters, including the zero-width space, and most browsers prohibit their use within domain names because they can be used to create a homograph attack, where a malicious URL is visually indistinguishable from a legitimate one.

== Encoding ==
Character information
Preview		
Unicode name	ZERO WIDTH SPACE	
Encodings	decimal	hex
Unicode	8203	U+200B
UTF-8	226 128 139	E2 80 8B
Numeric character reference	&#8203;	&#x200B;
Named character reference	&NegativeMediumSpace;, &NegativeThickSpace;, &NegativeThinSpace;, &NegativeVeryThinSpace;, &ZeroWidthSpace;	

The zero-width space character is encoded in Unicode as U+200B ZERO WIDTH SPACE.

In HTML, it can be referenced as &ZeroWidthSpace;, &#8203; or &#x200B;. Additionally, the character entities &NegativeThickSpace;, &NegativeMediumSpace;, &NegativeThinSpace;, and &NegativeVeryThinSpace; all also refer to the zero-width space, contrary to what their names suggest.

The TeX representation is \hskip0pt; the LaTeX representation is \hspace{0pt}; and the groff representation is \:.

As the zero-width space is an invisible character, it is convenient to have a visible symbol for it on keyboards and in keyboard documentation. The standard ISO/IEC 9995-7 gives symbol 72 for the zero-width space, which is also catalogued in IEC 60417 as reference 6072-10.

== See also ==
- Hair space
- Whitespace character – including a table comparing various space-like characters
- Word divider
- Word wrapping
- Word joiner (U+2060)
- U+FEFF (U+FEFF), which is named "Zero Width No-Break Space" in Unicode
- Zero-width joiner (U+200D)
- Zero-width non-joiner (U+200C)
