= Word joiner =

Character in text processing

Symbol for use on keyboards and in keyboard documentation

The word joiner (WJ) is a Unicode format character which is used to indicate that line breaking should not occur at its position. It does not affect the formation of ligatures or cursive joining and is ignored for the purpose of text segmentation. It is encoded since Unicode version 3.2 (released in 2002) as U+2060 WORD JOINER (&NoBreak;).

The word joiner replaces the zero-width no-break space (ZWNBSP, U+FEFF), as a usage of the no-break space of zero width. The ZWNBSP is originally and currently used as the byte order mark (BOM) at the start of a file. However, if encountered elsewhere, it should, according to Unicode, be treated as a word joiner, a no-break space of zero width.

The deliberate use of U+FEFF for this purpose is deprecated as of Unicode 3.2, with the word joiner strongly preferred.

As the word joiner is an invisible character, it is convenient to have a visible symbol for it on keyboards and in keyboard documentation. The standard ISO/IEC 9995-7 gives symbol 83 for the word joiner, which is identical to IEC 60417 symbol 6077-3.

== See also ==
- Byte order mark, which uses U+FEFF ZERO WIDTH NO-BREAK SPACE (ZWNBSP) character
- Zero-width space
- Zero-width joiner, which in scripts such as Arabic or Indic causes two characters to be shown in a connected form, even if they would otherwise not.
