= Index of graphonomics-related articles =

Typeface anatomy, showing typographic parts of a glyph: 1) x-height; 2) ascender line; 3) apex; 4) baseline; 5) ascender; 6) crossbar; 7) stem; 8) serif; 9) leg; 10) bowl; 11) counter; 12) collar/link/neck; 13) loop; 14) ear; 15) tie; 16) horizontal bar; 17) arm; 18) vertical bar; 19) cap height; 20) descender line.

The following is an alphabetical index of articles related to graphonomics. Most pages are generic and may not include any graphonomics material.

- Allograph – Distinct shapes of a written symbol
- Angular frequency – Rate of change of angle
- Ascender – Portion of a minuscule letter
- Aspect ratio (image) – Height/width proportion of an image
- Ballistic stroke – Single handwriting mark
- Baseline – Line in typography upon which most letters "sit" and below which descenders extend
- Connecting stroke
- Cursive – Style of penmanship script
- Curvature – Mathematical measure of how much a curve or surface deviates from flatness
- Curve – Mathematical idealization of the trace left by a moving point
- Delayed stroke – Time taken to make a mark
- Morphological derivation – Forming a new word on the basis of an existing one
- Descender – Portion of a letter that extends below the baseline of a font or script
- Digitization – Converting information into digital form
- Direction – Relative coordinate axes (in handwriting)
- Domain (graphonomics)
- Fluency (handwriting) – Study of handwriting and drawing
- Force – Influence that can change motion of an object
- Fourier spectrum – Branch of mathematics
- Power-spectral density function – Relative importance of certain frequencies in a composite signal
- Frequency – Number of occurrences or cycles per unit time
- Function (mathematics) – Association of one output to each input
- Graph (handwriting) – Study of handwriting and drawing
- Grapheme – Smallest functional written unit
- Guirland – Study of handwriting and drawing
- Handwriting – Writing created by a person with a writing implement (when not composition of text, see Writing)
- Horizontal progression
- Ink trace
- Ligature – Glyph combining two or more letterforms
- Lineation
- movement context in handwriting – Study of handwriting and drawing
- Movement parameter in handwriting
  - Slant (handwriting) – Angle of downward strokes in handwriting
  - Amplitude – Measure of change in a periodic variable
  - Orientation – Assigning directions to the edges of an undirected graph
  - Roundness (handwriting)
- Pattern – Regularity in sensory qualia or abstract ideas (handwriting)
- Pen lift
- Pen pressure
  - axial pen force
- Pen tilt
- Pen-tip velocity – Speed and direction of a motion
- Penup
- Phase (waves) – Elapsed fraction of a cycle of a periodic function
- Pitch (handwriting)
- Polar distribution – Type of probability distribution
- Rotation – Movement of an object which leaves at least one point unchanged
- Roundness (handwriting) (See also Phase (waves) – Elapsed fraction of a cycle of a periodic function)
- Running angle
- Sampling (signal processing) – Measurement of a signal at discrete time intervals
- Segment (handwriting) – Piece of the pen-tip trajectory in handwriting
- Handwriting generation – Study of handwriting and drawing
- Handwriting regeneration – Study of handwriting and drawing
- Slant (handwriting) – Angle of downward strokes in handwriting
- Sloppiness space
- Smoothing (Graphonomics)
  - Low-pass filter – Type of signal filter
- Stroke (handwriting)
- Trajectory – Path of a moving object
- Upward stroke
- x-height – Measurement of letters in a typeface (also known as 'Body size' and 'Corpus size')
