= Typeface anatomy =

Graphic components of typeface letters

Typographic parts of a glyph: 1) x-height; 2) ascender line; 3) apex; 4) baseline; 5) ascender; 6) crossbar; 7) stem; 8) serif; 9) leg; 10) bowl; 11) counter; 12) collar/link/neck; 13) loop; 14) ear; 15) tie; 16) horizontal bar; 17) arm; 18) vertical bar; 19) cap height; 20) descender height.

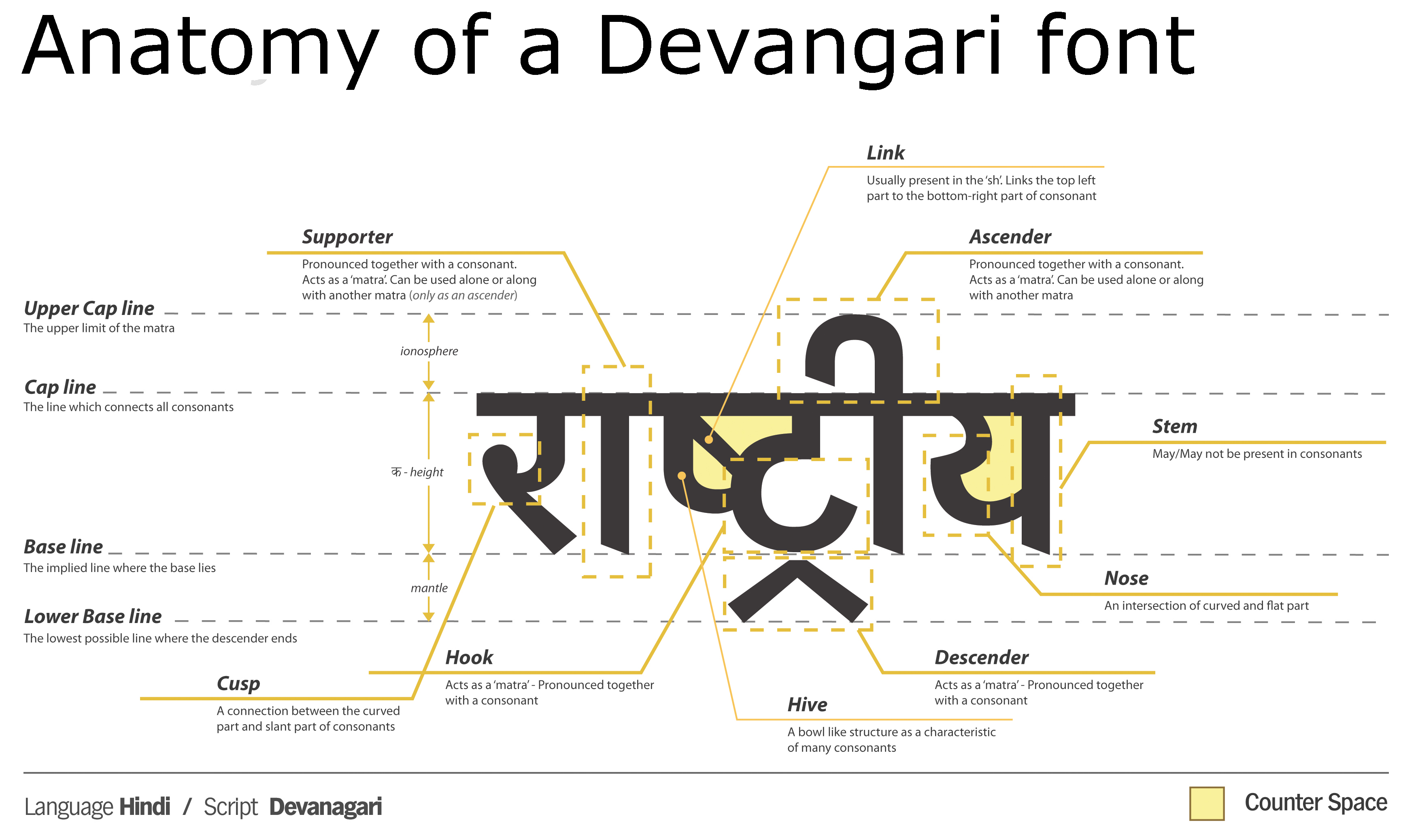
Anatomy of a Devanagari typeface

Typeface anatomy describes the graphic elements that make up letters in a typeface or font (a specific size, slope, and style of a typeface).

== Strokes ==
The strokes are the components of a letterform. Stroke shape in many typefaces is influenced by historical methods of writing, such as the shape of a tool, the angle at which it is applied, and the degree of pressure used.

=== Terminology ===
Strokes may be straight, as in k l v w x z, or curved, as in c o s. If straight, they may be horizontal, vertical, or diagonal; if curved, open or closed. Typographers also speak of an instroke, where one starts writing the letter, as at the top of a c f, and an outstroke, where the pen leaves off, as at the bottom of c e j k t y.

A main vertical stroke is a stem. The letter m has three, the left, middle, and right stems. The central stroke of an s is known as the spine. When the stroke is part of a lowercase and rises above the height of an x (the x height), it is known as an ascender. Letters with ascenders are b d f h k l. A stroke which drops below the baseline is a descender. Letters with descenders are g j p q y.

An arching stroke is a shoulder as in the top of an R or sometimes just an arch, as in h n m. A closed curved stroke is a bowl in b d o p q D O P Q; B has two bowls. A bowl with a flat end as in D P is a lobe. A trailing outstroke, as in j y J Q R is a tail. The inferior diagonal stroke in K is a leg. The bottom of the two-story g is a loop; the very short stroke at the top is the ear. The letters i j each have a dot or tittle.

A short horizontal stroke, as in the center of e f and the middle stroke of E F, is a bar. Strokes that connect, as in A and H, or cross other strokes, as in t, are also known as crossbars. A longer horizontal stroke at the top or bottom, as in E T, is an arm. The junction of two strokes intersecting above as in A M X x is an apex and the joining of two strokes intersecting below as in V W v w is a vertex.

=== Stress or contrast ===
The font shown in the example is stressed; this means that strokes have varying widths. In this example, the stroke at the top of the "g" is thinner at the top and bottom than on the sides – a vertical stress. Fonts without any variation in the stroke width are known as monoline fonts. Stress is also known as contrast. Reverse-contrast typefaces flip the normal convention of which strokes should be thin vs. thick.

=== Weight ===
The weight of a particular font is the thickness of the character outlines relative to their height.

Weights of the typeface Neue Helvetica

A typeface may come in fonts of many weights, from ultra-light to extra-bold or black; four to six weights are not unusual, and a few typefaces have as many as a dozen. Many typefaces for office, web and non-professional use come with a normal and a bold weight which are linked together. If no bold weight is provided, many renderers (browsers, word processors, graphic and DTP programs) support a bolder font by rendering the outline a second time at an offset, or smearing it slightly at a diagonal angle.

The base weight differs among typefaces; that means one font may appear bolder than another font. For example, fonts intended to be used in posters are often bold by default while fonts for long runs of text are rather light. Weight designations in font names may differ in regard to the actual absolute stroke weight or density of glyphs in the font.

Attempts to systematize a range of weights led to a numerical classification first used in 1957 by Adrian Frutiger with the Univers typeface: 35 Extra Light, 45 Light, 55 Medium or Regular, 65 Bold, 75 Extra Bold, 85 Extra Bold, 95 Ultra Bold or Black. Deviants of these were the "6 series" (italics), e.g. 46 Light Italics etc., the "7 series" (condensed versions), e.g. 57 Medium Condensed etc., and the "8 series" (condensed italics), e.g. 68 Bold Condensed Italics. From this brief numerical system it is easier to determine exactly what a font's characteristics are, for instance "Helvetica 67" (HE67) translates to "Helvetica Bold Condensed".

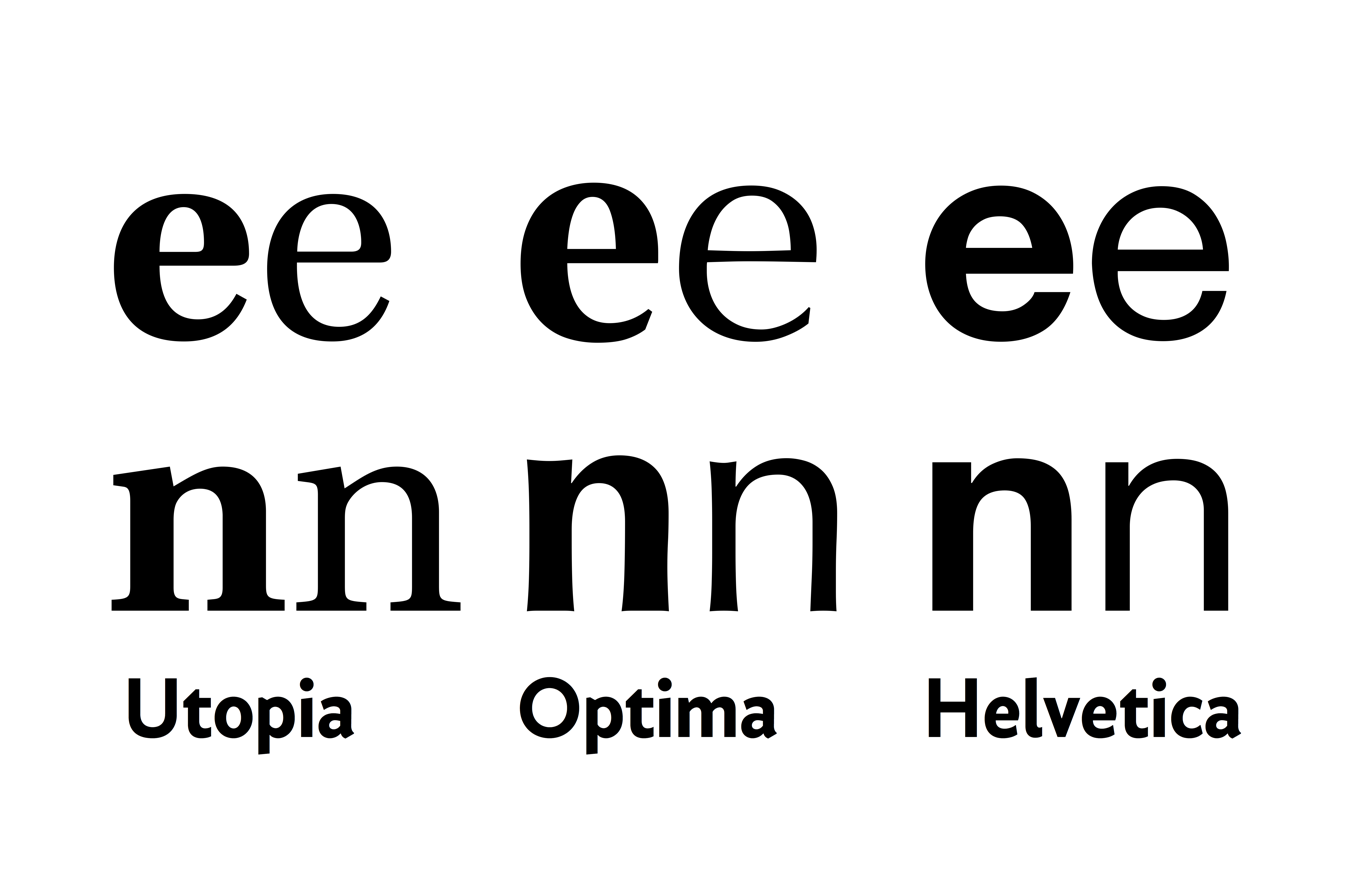
Bold and regular versions of three common fonts. Helvetica has a monoline design and all strokes increase in weight in bold. Less monoline fonts like Optima and Utopia increase the weight of the thicker strokes more. In all three designs, the curve on 'n' thins as it joins the left-hand vertical.

The first algorithmic description of fonts was made by Donald Knuth in his 1986 Metafont description language and interpreter.

The TrueType font format introduced a scale from 100 through 900, which is also used in CSS and OpenType, where 400 is regular (roman or plain).

The Mozilla Developer Network provides the following rough mapping to typical font weight names:

Names	Numerical values
Thin / Hairline	100
Ultra-light / Extra-light	200
Light	300
Normal / regular	400
Medium	500
Semi-bold / Demi-bold	600
Bold	700
Extra-bold / Ultra-bold	800
Heavy / Black	900
Extra-black / Ultra-black	950

Font mapping varies by font designer. A good example is Bigelow and Holmes's Go Go font family. In this family, the "fonts have CSS numerical weights of 400, 500, and 600. Although CSS specifies 'Bold' as a 700 weight and 600 as Semibold or Demibold, the Go numerical weights match the actual progression of the ratios of stem thicknesses: Normal:Medium = 400:500; Normal:Bold = 400:600".

The terms normal, regular and plain (sometimes book) are used for the standard-weight font of a typeface. Where both appear and differ, book is often lighter than regular, but in some typefaces it is bolder.

Before the arrival of computers, each weight had to be drawn manually. As a result, many older multi-weight families such as Gill Sans and Monotype Grotesque have considerable differences in weights from light to extra-bold. Since the 1980s, it has become common to use automation to construct a range of weights as points along a trend, multiple master or other parameterized font design. This means that many modern digital fonts such as Myriad and TheSans are offered in a large range of weights which offer a smooth and continuous transition from one weight to the next, although some digital fonts are created with extensive manual corrections.

As digital font design allows more variants to be created faster, a common development in professional font design is the use of "grades": slightly different weights intended for different types of paper and ink, or printing in a different region with different ambient temperature and humidity. For example, a thin design printed on book paper and a thicker design printed on high-gloss magazine paper may come out looking identical, since in the former case the ink will soak and spread out more. Grades are offered with characters having the same width on all grades, so that a change of printing materials does not affect copy-fit. Grades are common on serif fonts with their finer details.

Fonts in which the bold and non-bold letters have the same width are "duplexed".

Variable fonts are computer fonts that can store and use a continuous range of weight (and size) variants of a single typeface.

== Terminals ==
Liberation Sans, a sans-serif font

Liberation Serif, a serif font

The Liberation Serif font with serifs highlighted in red

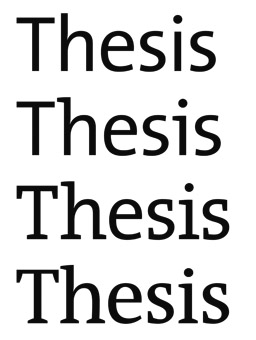
Serifs within the Thesis typeface family

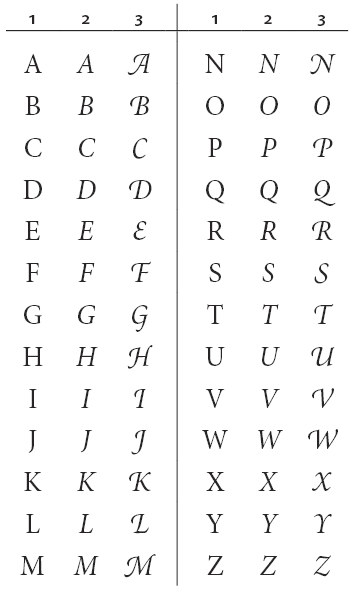
Italic capital swashes in the typeface Minion

The terminal (end) of an instroke or outstroke is often a serif or a stroke ending. A seriffed terminal may be described as a wedge, bulbous, teardrop, slab serif, etc., depending on the design of the type. Typefaces may be classified by their look, of which the weight and serif style – whether serif or sans-serif – are key features. Some designs also have spurs, which are smaller than serifs and appear on angles rather than at a terminal, as on e or G.

Serif typefaces are also known as antiqua, and slab serif is known as Egyptian. Typefaces without serifs are known as sans serif (sans means "without" in French) or grotesque (or, in German, grotesk).

Great variety exists among both serif and sans-serif typefaces. Both groups contain faces designed for setting large amounts of body text, and others intended primarily as decorative.

Typefaces with serifs are often considered easier to read in long passages than those without. Studies on the matter are ambiguous, suggesting that most of this effect is due to the greater familiarity of serif typefaces. As a general rule, printed works such as newspapers and books almost always use serif typefaces, at least for the text body. Websites do not have to specify a font and can simply respect the browser settings of the user. But of those web sites that do specify a font, most use modern sans-serif fonts, because it is commonly believed that, in contrast to the case for printed material, sans-serif fonts are easier than serif fonts to read on the low-resolution computer screen.

Some font superfamilies incorporate both serif and sans-serif or even intermediate slab serif or semi-serif fonts with the same base outlines. A more common font variant, especially of serif typefaces, is that of alternate capitals. They can have swashes to go with italic minuscules or they can be of a flourish design for use as initials (drop caps).

== Space ==
Areas of negative space (white space) enclosed by strokes are called counters or counterforms. Closed counters are found in a b d e g o p q A B D O P Q R, and open counters in a c e f h m n r s t u. The closed counter in e is also named an eye. The term storey refers to stacked counters: When the letter a appears with two counters it is referred to as double-storey a, and when the letter g appears with two closed counters it is known as double-storey g.

Angles of white space, as in W w, are corners (w has three corners); the term is not used for angles of strokes. The small corner formed by a serif, whether curved or angular, is called the serif bracket.

Inter-letter space can be reduced with kerning. A kern is the part of a letter that intrudes into the "box" of an adjacent glyph.

== Geometric ratios ==
A subtle change in proportion impacts weight, perception, measure, and legibility. The letterform height compared to its stroke width modifies the aspect ratio; a slight change in weight sometimes helps to create emphasis. The disparity between thick and thin strokes, known as stress, alters optical perception. As an example, the first sans serif typefaces used strokes of constant thickness, but subsequent technological advances permit drawing thinner strokes. Condensed type occupies less space than expanded type, so that a whole page of text can be reduced to half a page. The capline and x-height ratio improve or decrease word legibility.

== Character width ==
=== Fixed vs. variable ===
Proportional versus monospace typefaces

A proportional typeface, also called variable-width typeface, contains glyphs of varying widths, while a monospaced (non-proportional or fixed-width) typeface uses a single standard width for all glyphs in the font. Duospaced fonts are similar to monospaced fonts, but characters can also be two character widths instead of a single character width.

Most typefaces either have proportional or monospaced (for example, those resembling typewriter output) letter widths, if the script provides the possibility. Some superfamilies include both proportional and monospaced fonts. Some fonts also provide both proportional and fixed-width (tabular) digits, where the former usually coincide with lowercase text figures and the latter with uppercase lining figures.

Many people generally find proportional typefaces nicer-looking and easier to read, and thus they appear more commonly in professionally published printed material. For the same reason, GUI computer applications, such as word processors and web browsers, typically use proportional fonts. However, many proportional fonts contain fixed-width (tabular) numerals so that columns of numbers stay aligned.

Monospaced typefaces function better for some purposes because their glyphs line up in neat, regular columns. No glyph is given any more weight than another. Most manually operated typewriters use monospaced fonts, and a typeface that looks like it was typewritten is sometimes referred to as a typescript. So do text-only computer displays and third- and fourth-generation game console graphics processors, which treat the screen as a uniform grid of character cells. Most computer programs which have a text-based interface—terminal emulators, for example—use only monospaced fonts or add additional spacing to proportional fonts to fit them in monospaced cells in their configuration. Monospaced fonts are commonly used by computer programmers for displaying and editing source code so that certain characters, for example parentheses used to group arithmetic expressions, are easy to see.

ASCII art usually requires a monospaced font for proper viewing, with the exception of Shift JIS art which takes advantage of the proportional characters in the MS PGothic font. In a web page, the <tt> </tt>, <code> </code> or <pre> </pre> HTML tags most commonly specify monospaced fonts. In LaTeX, the verbatim environment or the Teletype font family (e.g., \texttt{...} or {\ttfamily ...}) uses monospaced fonts (in TeX, use {\tt ...}).

Any two lines of text with the same number of characters in each line in a monospaced typeface should display as equal in width, while the same two lines in a proportional typeface may have radically different widths. This occurs because in a proportional font, glyph widths vary, such that wider glyphs—typically those for characters such as W, Q, Z, M, D, O, H, and U—use more space, and narrower glyphs—such as those for the characters i, t, l, and 1—use less space than the average.

In the publishing industry, it was once the case that editors read manuscripts in monospaced fonts—typically Courier—for ease of editing and word count estimates, and it was considered discourteous to submit a manuscript in a proportional font. This has become less universal in recent years, such that authors need to check with editors as to their preference, though monospaced fonts are still the norm.

=== Condensed vs. wide ===
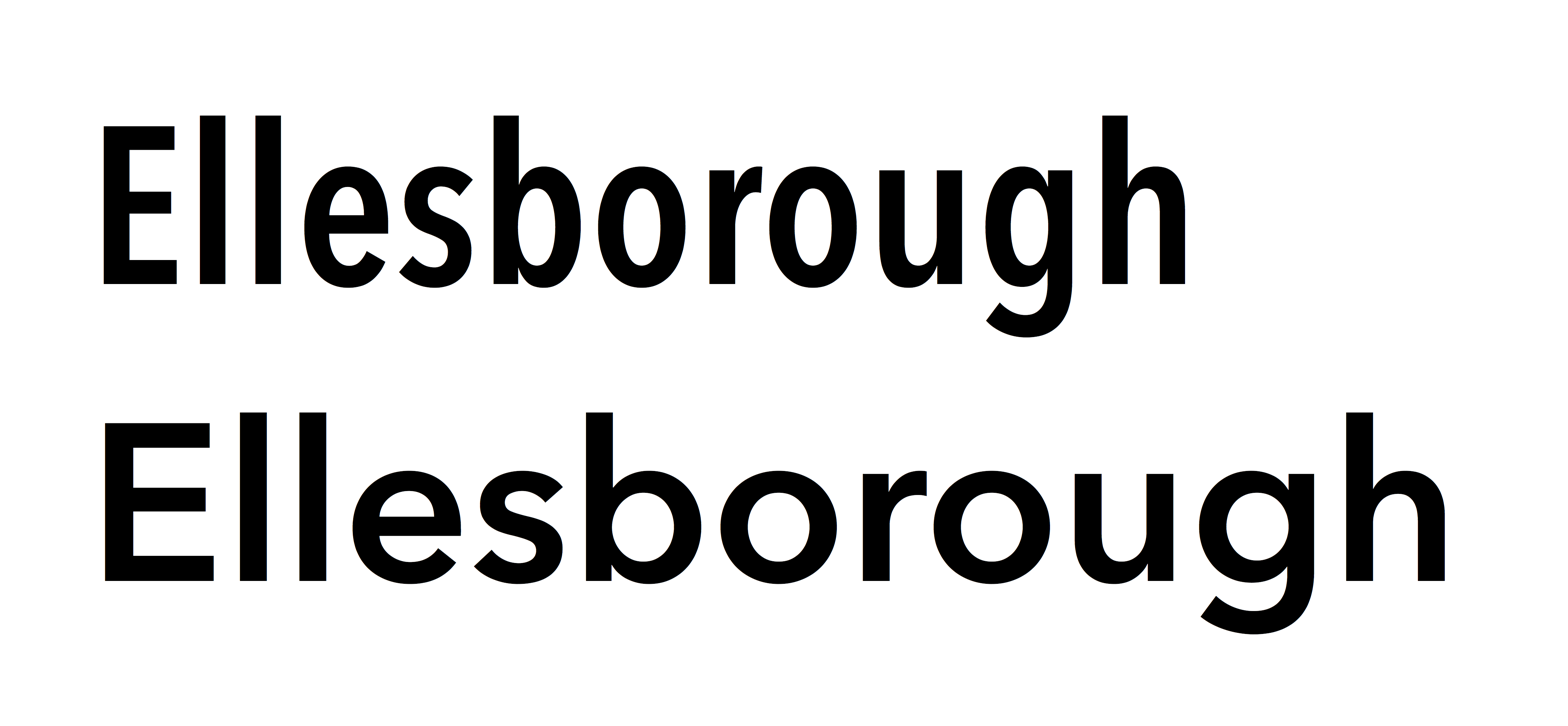
The typeface Avenir Next in condensed and regular widths

Narrower fonts are usually labeled compressed, condensed or narrow. In Frutiger's system, the second digit of condensed fonts is a 7. Wider fonts may be called wide, extended or expanded. Both can be further classified by prepending extra, ultra or the like. Compressing a font design to a condensed weight is a complex task, requiring the strokes to be slimmed down proportionally and often making the capitals straight-sided. (Note: Simply digitally compressing the font produces ugly results, since it narrows the vertical strokes but not the horizontals.) It is particularly common to see condensed fonts for sans-serif and slab-serif families, since it is relatively practical to modify their structure to a condensed weight. Serif text faces are often only issued in the regular width.

The width of a font will depend on its intended use. Times New Roman was designed with the goal of having small width, to fit more text into a newspaper. On the other hand, Palatino has large width to increase readability. The "billing block" on a movie poster often uses extremely condensed type in order to meet union requirements on the people who must be credited and the font height relative to the rest of the poster.

Glyph width is generally not altered by techniques used to generate justified text alignment; letter spacing is generally altered instead. Some typefaces do include fonts that vary the width of the characters (known as stretch), although this feature is usually rarer than variability in weight or slope.

== Font metrics ==
The word Sphinx, set in Adobe Garamond Pro to illustrate the concepts of baseline, x-height, body size, descent and ascent

Font metrics are numeric values relating to size and space in a font overall, or in its individual glyphs.

Most scripts share the notion of a baseline: an imaginary horizontal line on which characters rest. In some scripts, parts of glyphs lie below the baseline. The descent spans the distance between the baseline and the lowest descending glyph in a typeface, and the part of a glyph that descends below the baseline has the name descender. Conversely, the ascent spans the distance between the baseline and the top of the glyph that reaches farthest from the baseline. The ascent and descent may or may not include distance added by accents or diacritical marks.

For font-wide metrics, in the Latin, Greek and Cyrillic scripts, sometimes collectively referred to as LGC, one can refer to the distance from the baseline to the top of regular lowercase glyphs, known as the mean line, as the x-height, and the part of a glyph rising above the x-height as the ascender. The distance from the baseline to the top of the ascent or a regular uppercase glyphs, known as the cap line, is also known as the cap height. A font in general will have an overall bounding box. The height of the ascender can have a dramatic effect on the readability and appearance of a font. The ratio between the x-height and the ascent or cap height often serves to characterize typefaces.

Glyph-level metrics include the glyph bounding box, the advance width (the proper distance between the glyph's initial pen position and the next glyph's initial pen position), and sidebearings (space that pads the glyph outline on either side). Many digital (and some metal type) fonts can be kerned so that characters can be fitted more closely; the pair "Wa" is a common example of this.

Kerning brings A and V closer with their serifs over each other

Some fonts, especially those intended for professional use, are duplexed: made with multiple weights having the same character width so that (for example) changing from regular to bold or italic does not affect word wrap. Sabon as originally designed was an example of this. (This was a standard feature of the Linotype hot metal typesetting system with regular and italic being duplexed, requiring awkward design choices as italics normally are narrower than the roman.)

A particularly important basic set of fonts that became an early standard in digital printing was the Core Font Set included in the PostScript printing system developed by Apple and Adobe. To avoid paying licensing fees for this set, computer companies commissioned metrically compatible fonts with the same spacing, which could be used to display the same document without it seeming clearly different. For example, Arial and Century Gothic are functional equivalents to the PostScript standard fonts Helvetica and ITC Avant Garde respectively. Some of these sets were created in order to be freely redistributable, for example Red Hat's Liberation fonts and Google's Croscore fonts, which duplicate the PostScript set and other common fonts used in Microsoft software such as Calibri. It is not a requirement that a metrically compatible design be identical to its origin in appearance apart from width.

Typefaces that can be substituted for one another in a document without changing the document's text flow are said to be "metrically identical" or "metrically compatible". Several typefaces have been created to be metrically compatible with widely used proprietary typefaces to allow the editing of documents set in such typefaces in digital typesetting environments where these typefaces are not available. For instance, the free and open-source Liberation fonts and Croscore fonts have been designed as metrically compatible substitutes for widely used Microsoft fonts.

== Style ==
Typefaces are born from the struggle between rules and results. Squeezing a square about 1% helps it look more like a square; to appear the same height as a square, a circle must be measurably taller. The two strokes in an X aren't the same thickness, nor are their parallel edges actually parallel; the vertical stems of a lowercase alphabet are thinner than those of its capitals; the ascender on a d isn't the same length as the descender on a p, and so on. For the rational mind, type design can be a maddening game of drawing things differently in order to make them appear the same.

— Hoefler & Frere-Jones

=== Slope ===
Cyrillic italics and allowed variations

In European typefaces, especially Latin script, a slope or slanted style is used to emphasize important words. This is called italic type or oblique type. These designs normally slant to the right in left-to-right scripts. Letters slanted to the left are known as reverse oblique or backslanted. Oblique styles are often called italic, but differ from "true italic" styles. The regular upright, perpendicular form is known as roman. The angle of notionally vertical strokes in a font is known as its posture.

Italic styles are more flowing than the normal typeface, approaching a more handwritten, cursive style, possibly using ligatures more commonly or gaining swashes. Although rarely encountered, a typographic face may be accompanied by a matching calligraphic face (cursive, script), giving an exaggeratedly italic style.

In many sans-serif and some serif typefaces, especially in those with strokes of even thickness, the characters of the italic fonts are only slanted, which is often done algorithmically, without otherwise changing their appearance. Such oblique fonts are not true italics, because lowercase letter shapes do not change, but they are often marketed as such. Fonts normally do not include both oblique and italic styles: the designer chooses to supply one or the other.

Since italic styles clearly look different than regular (roman) styles, it is possible to have "upright italic" designs that take a more cursive form but remain upright; Computer Modern is an example of a font that offers this style. In Latin-script countries, upright italics are rare but are sometimes used in mathematics or in complex documents where a section of text already in italics needs a "double italic" style to add emphasis to it. For example, the Cyrillic minuscule "т" may look like a smaller form of its majuscule "Т" or more like a roman small "m" as in its standard italic appearance; in this case, the distinction between styles is also a matter of local preference.

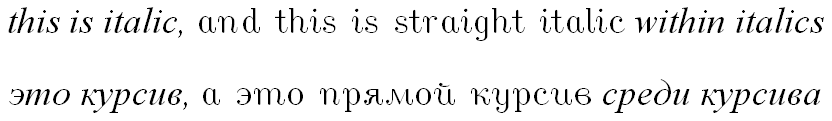
'Upright italic' within normal italics

=== Other style attributes ===
In Frutiger's nomenclature the second digit for upright fonts is a 5, for italic fonts a 6 and for condensed italic fonts an 8.

The two Japanese syllabaries, katakana and hiragana, are sometimes seen as two styles or typographic variants of each other, but usually are considered separate character sets as a few of the characters have separate kanji origins and the scripts are used for different purposes. The gothic style of the roman script with broken letter forms, on the other hand, is usually considered a mere typographic variant.

Cursive-only scripts such as Arabic also have different styles, in this case for example Naskh and Kufic, although these often depend on application, area or era.

There are other aspects that can differ among font styles, but more often these are considered intrinsic features of the typeface. These include the look of digits (text figures) and the minuscules, which may be smaller versions of the capital letters (small caps) although the script has developed characteristic shapes for them. Some typefaces do not include separate glyphs for the cases at all, thereby abolishing the bicamerality. While most of these use uppercase characters only, some labeled unicase exist which choose either the majuscule or the minuscule glyph at a common height for both characters.

Titling fonts are designed for headlines and displays, and have stroke widths optimized for large sizes.

== Optical size ==
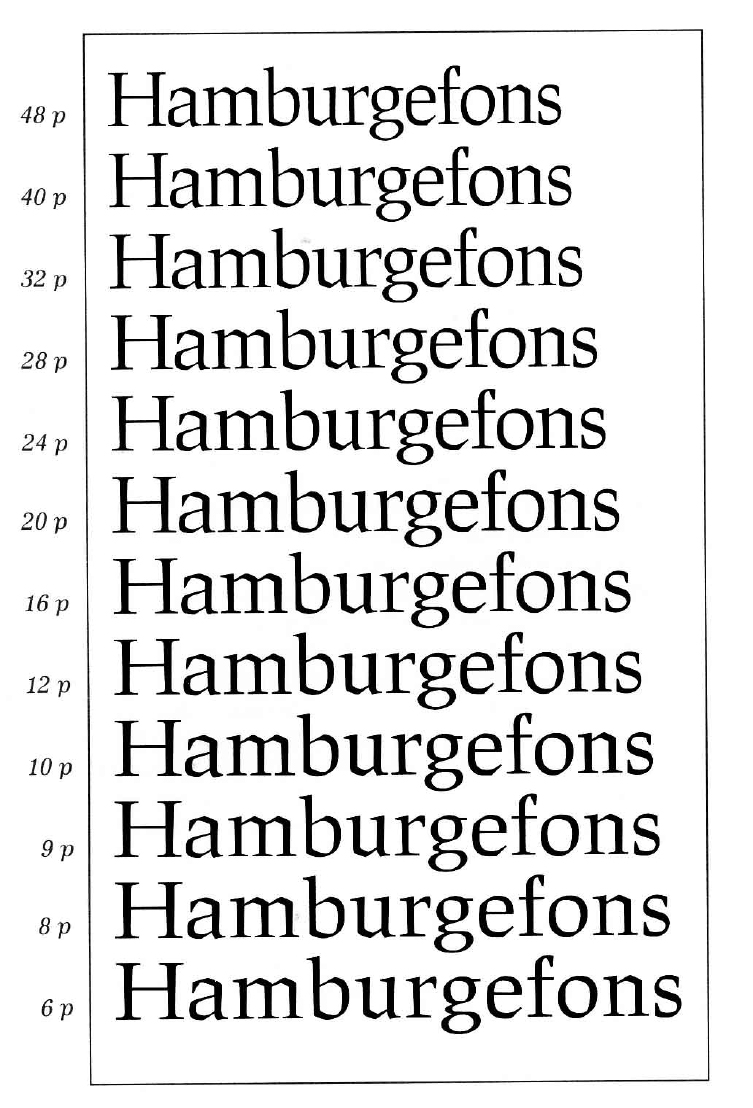
A set of optical sizes developed at URW of the typeface Leipziger Antiqua. The fonts become thicker and more widely spaced as the point size for which they are designed decreases.

Optical sizes refer to different versions of the same typefaces optimised for specific font sizes. For instance, thinner stroke weight might be used if a font style is intended for large-size display use, or ink traps might be added to the design if it is to be printed at small size on poor-quality paper. In the metal type period, when all type was cut in metal and could only be printed at a specific size. It was a natural process to vary a design at different sizes, making it chunkier and clearer to read at smaller sizes. As an example of this, experienced Linotype designer Chauncey H. Griffith commented in 1947 that for a type he was working on intended for newspaper use, the 6 point size was not 50% as wide as the 12 point size, (Note: In metal type, the point size of the font describes the height (not width) of the metal body on which the typeface's characters were cast. The typeface was the "Falcon" design by William Addison Dwiggins, ultimately never issued.) but about 71%.

Designs to be printed on absorbent newsprint paper are more slender, as the ink naturally spreads as it is absorbed into the paper, and may feature ink traps—areas left blank into which the ink will soak as it dries. These corrections will not be needed for printing on high-gloss cardboard or display on-screen. Fonts designed for low-resolution displays, meanwhile, may avoid pure circles, fine lines and details a screen cannot render.

Optical sizing declined in use as pantograph engraving emerged, while phototypesetting and digital fonts further made printing the same font at any size simpler. A mild revival has taken place in recent years, although typefaces with optical sizes remain rare. Recent variable font technology further allows designers to include an optical size axis for a typeface, which means end users can manually adjust optical sizing on a continuous scale. Examples of variable fonts with such an axis are Roboto Flex and Helvetica Now Variable.

Many digital typefaces are offered with a range of fonts or a variable font axis for different sizes, especially designs sold for professional design use. Others will be offered in only one style, but optimized for a specific size. Optical sizes are particularly common for serif fonts; the fine detail of serif fonts can need to be bulked up for smaller sizes and made less overpowering at larger ones. Furthermore, it is often desirable for mathematical fonts (i.e., typefaces designed for typesetting mathematical equations) to have two optical sizes below "Regular", typically for higher-order superscripts and subscripts which are very small in sizes. Examples of such mathematical fonts include Minion Math and MathTime 2.

=== Naming convention ===
Naming schemes for optical sizes vary. One such scheme, invented and popularised by Adobe, labels the variant designs by their typical usages (with the intended point sizes varying slightly by typefaces):

- Poster: Extremely large sizes, usually larger than 72 point
- Display: Large sizes, typically 19–72 point
- Subhead: Large text, typically about 14–18 point
- "Regular" or "Text": Usually left unnamed, typically about 10–13 point
- Small Text (SmText): Typically about 8–10 point
- Caption: Very small, typically about 4–8 point

Other type designers and publishers might use different naming schemes. For instance, the smaller optical size of Helvetica Now is labelled "Micro", while the display variant of Hoefler Text is called "Titling". Another example is Times, whose variants are labelled by their intended point sizes, such as Times Ten, Times Eighteen, and Times New Roman Seven.

Variable fonts typically do not use any naming scheme, because the inclusion of an adjustable optical size axis means optical sizes are not released as separate products.

== Metal type era ==
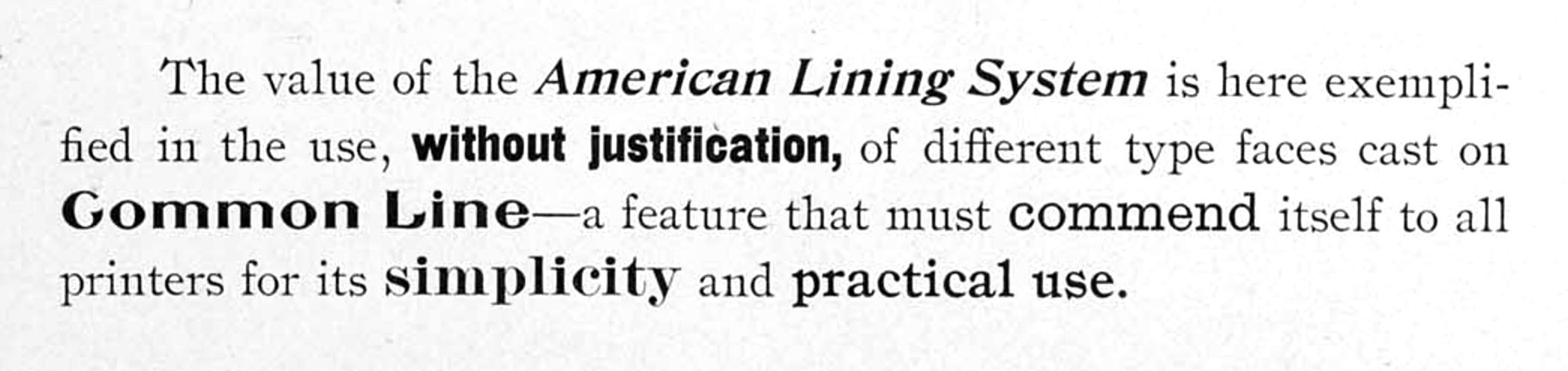
Example of paragraph set in different typefaces using the common line, named American Lining System in this promotional material published in 1903.

During the late metal type period, many fonts (particularly in American typefounding) were issued to "common line". This meant that they were made to standardised proportions, so that fonts of different typefaces could be mixed with no difficulty. This made it possible to mix typefaces from completely different genres such as sans-serifs and serifs and have the cap height, baseline and linespacing match perfectly, something not possible with most computer fonts. It even allowed mixing of different sizes of type with a consistent baseline. It however had the disadvantage of often forcing typefaces to be issued with cropped descenders compared to historical typefaces, to allow tight linespacing. A "script line" or "art line" was used for more delicate fonts with long descenders. Titling capitals, meanwhile, were issued taking up the whole space of the metal type area, with no room for descenders.

== Typesetting numbers ==
Hoefler Text uses text figures (also known as non-lining or lower-case).

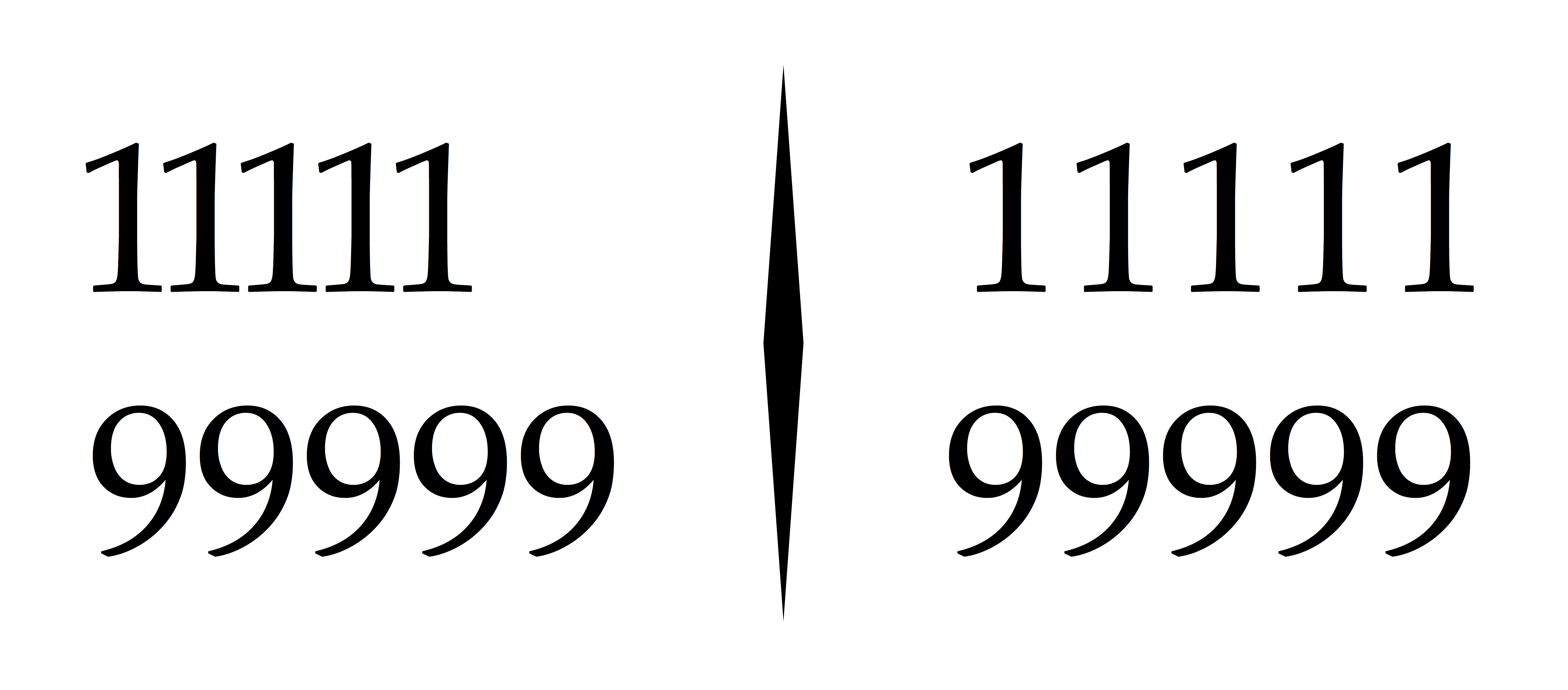
Proportional (left-side) and tabular (right-side) numeric digits, drawn as lining figures

Most typefaces, especially modern designs, include a complementary set of numeric digits.

Numbers can be typeset in two main independent sets of ways: lining and non-lining figures, and proportional and tabular styles. There are a few other styles occasionally used, most notably small-cap figures set uniformly at the height of the small capitals, and "short-ranging figures" slightly lower than cap height.

=== Non-lining figures ===
Most modern typefaces set numeric digits by default as lining figures, which are the height of upper-case letters. Non-lining figures, styled to match lower-case letters, are often common in fonts intended for body text, as they are thought to be less disruptive to the style of running text. They are also called lower-case numbers or text figures for the same reason.

=== Tabular figures ===
The horizontal spacing of digits can also be proportional, with a character width tightly matching the width of the figure itself, or tabular, where all digits have the same width. Proportional spacing places the digits closely together, reducing empty space in a document, and is thought to allow the numbers to blend into the text more effectively. As tabular spacing makes all numbers with the same number of digits the same width, it is used for typesetting documents such as price lists, stock listings and sums in mathematics textbooks, all of which require columns of numeric figures to line up on top of each other for easier comparison. Tabular spacing is also a common feature of simple printing devices such as cash registers and date-stamps.

Characters of uniform width are a standard feature of so-called monospaced fonts, used in programming and on typewriters. However, many fonts that are not monospaced use tabular figures. More complex font designs may include two or more combinations with one as the default and others as alternate characters. Of the four possibilities, non-lining tabular figures are particularly rare since there is no common use for them.

Fonts intended for professional use in documents such as business reports may also make the bold-style tabular figures take up the same width as the regular (non-bold) numbers, so a bold-style total would appear just as wide as the same sum in regular style.

=== Additional figure variations ===
Fonts may include separate shapes for superscript and subscript digits. Professional computer fonts may include even more complex settings for typesetting digits, such as digits intended to match the height of small caps. In addition, some fonts such as Adobe's Acumin and Christian Schwartz's Neue Haas Grotesk digitisation offer two heights of lining (uppercase height) figures: one slightly lower than cap height, intended to blend better into continuous text, and one at exactly the cap height to look better in combination with capitals for uses such as UK postcodes.

== Character variants ==
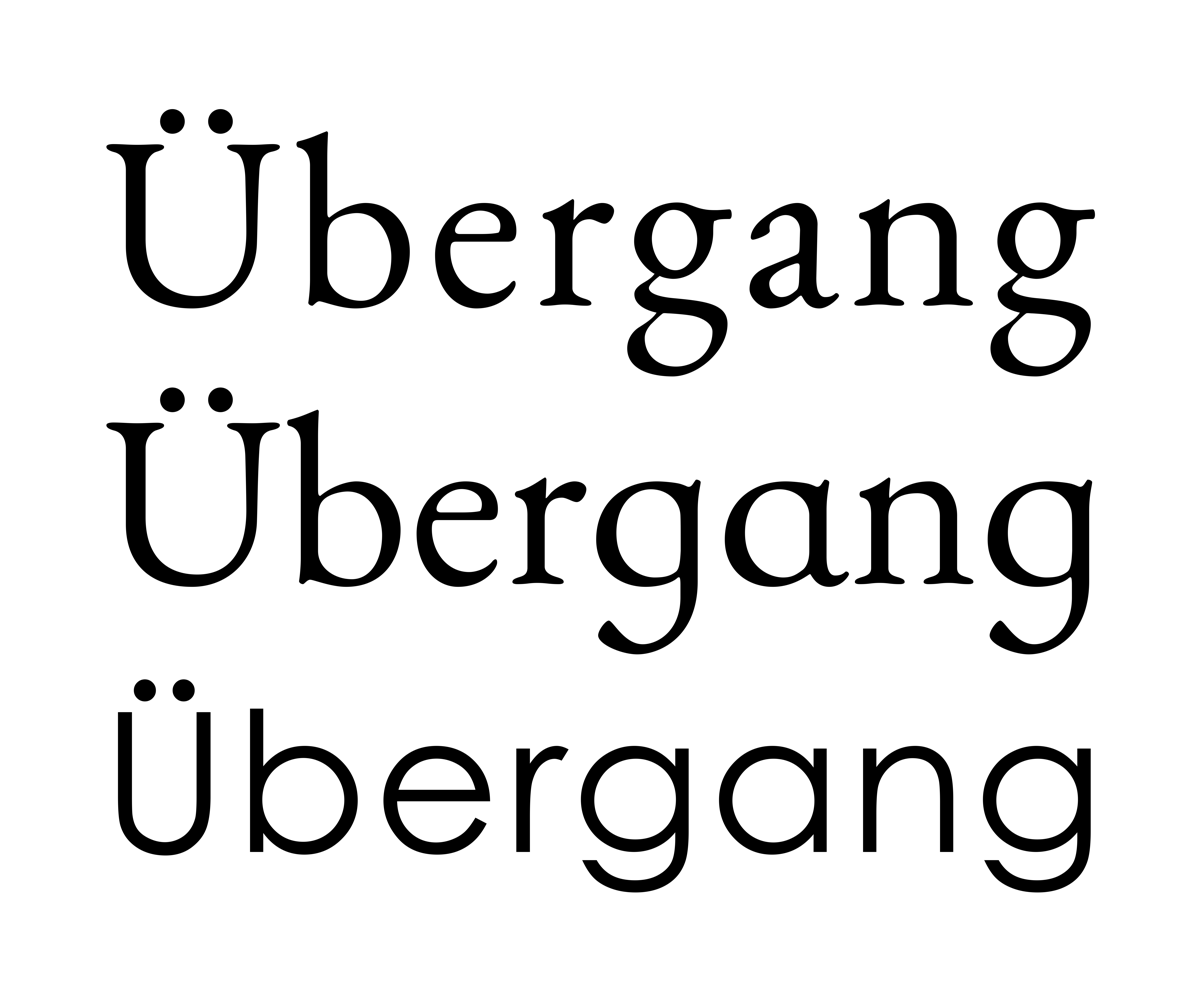
EB Garamond's regular and schoolbook versions of a and g. Single-storey characters are more commonly found as default in geometric sans-serif fonts such as Century Gothic, shown at bottom.

The Open Type Andika font in a word-processor with two character variants selected

Typefaces may be made in variants for different uses. These may be issued as separate font files, or the different characters may be included in the same font file if the font is a modern format such as OpenType and the application used can support this.

Alternative characters are often called stylistic alternates. These may be switched on to allow users more flexibility to customise the typeface to suit their needs. The practice is not new: in the 1930s, Gill Sans, a British design, was sold abroad with alternative characters to make it resemble typefaces such as Futura popular in other countries, while Bembo from the same period has two shapes of "R": one with a stretched-out leg, matching its fifteenth-century model, and one less-common shorter version. With modern digital fonts, it is possible to group related alternative characters into stylistic sets, which may be turned on and off together. For example, in Williams Caslon Text, a revival of the 18th century Caslon typeface, the default italic forms have many swashes matching the original design. For a more spare appearance, these can all be turned off at once by engaging stylistic set 4. Junicode, intended for academic publishing, uses ss15 to enable a variant form of "e" used in medieval Latin. Other free fonts that include style and character variants include Gentium and DejaVu Serif. A corporation commissioning a modified version of a commercial computer font for their own use, meanwhile, might request that their preferred alternates be set to default.

It is common for typefaces intended for use in books for young children to use simplified, single-storey forms of the lowercase letters a and g (sometimes also t, y, l and the digit 4); these may be called infant or schoolbook alternatives. They are traditionally believed to be easier for children to read and less confusing as they resemble the forms used in handwriting. Often schoolbook characters are released as a supplement to popular families such as Akzidenz-Grotesk, Gill Sans and Bembo; well-known fonts intended specifically for school use include Sassoon Sans and Andika.

Besides alternate characters, in the metal type era The New York Times commissioned custom condensed single sorts for common long names that might often appear in news headings, such as "Eisenhower", "Chamberlain" or "Rockefeller".

== Unicase ==
Writing systems that have distinct letter case have different shapes for most or all uppercase and lowercase letters. Some fonts known as unicase, display glyphs of a uniform height for both.

== Structural groups ==
When designing letterforms, characters with analogous structures can be grouped in consideration of their shared visual qualities. In Latin script, for example, archetypal groups can be made based on the dominant strokes of each letter: verticals and horizontals (E F H L T), diagonals (V W X), verticals and diagonals (K M N Y), horizontals and diagonals (A Z), circular strokes (C O Q S), circular strokes and verticals (B D G P R U), and verticals (I J).

== See also ==
- Type design
- Type foundry
- Typography
- Typesetting
