= Lineation (handwriting) =

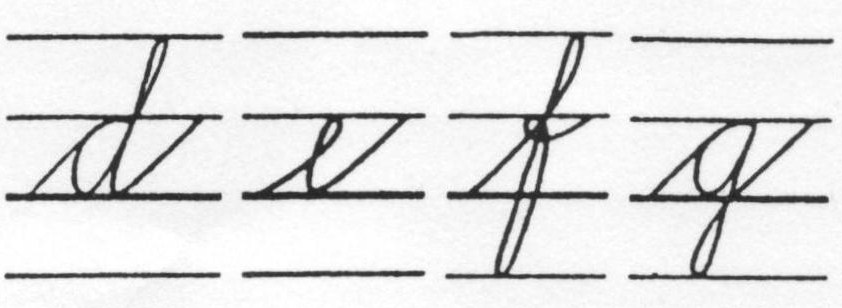
A sample of cursive handwriting on ruled paper showing the four lines associated with lineation.

In Western handwriting, lineation is the particular spacing between the baseline and the median or mean line (a distance known as the x-height or corpus size), the height of the ascenders, and the depth of the descenders. In many teaching methods of writing at primary school, these guidelines are actually present on ruled paper to aid the child in producing well-formed characters of the proper size. In adulthood the lineation remains, virtually, and can be used in handwriting recognition by performing an analysis of the horizontal density of minima, and maxima of the writing trace. The density at the baseline of handwriting will be highest, followed by the density of the corpus size. As ascenders and descenders occur only infrequently, their densities will be low, especially if a single word is considered.

== See also ==
- Graphonomics
