= Overshoot =

Overshoot may refer to:

- Overshoot: The Ecological Basis of Revolutionary Change, a 1980 book by William R. Catton, Jr.
- Ecological overshoot, when the demands made on a natural ecosystem exceed its regenerative capacity
- Climate overshoot, global warming beyond the 1.5-degree limit set by the Paris Agreement
- Overshoot (population), when a population exceeds the environment's carrying capacity
- Overshoot (signal), when a signal exceeds its steady state value
- Overshoot (microwave communication), the unintended reception of microwave signals
- Overshoot (migration), when migratory birds end up further than intended
- Overshoot (typography), the degree to which a letter dips below the baseline, or exceeds the cap height
- Overshoot (aviation), a key concept in basic fighter maneuvers (BFM)
- Overshoot (epidemiology), when the proportion of a population infected exceeds the herd immunity threshold
- Overshooting model, a theoretical explanation for high levels of exchange rate volatility
