= Font =

Particular size, weight and style of a typeface

The Bauer Bodoni typeface, with samples of the three of the fonts in the family: Roman (or regular), bold, and italic.

In metal typesetting, a font is a particular size, weight, and style of a typeface, a set of fonts that share an overall design. For instance, the typeface Bauer Bodoni (shown in the figure) includes fonts "Roman 12pt" (or "regular"), "bold 12pt" and "italic 12pt"; each of these styles is also available in a range of other common sizes. In traditional printing, fonts were physically created using metal or wood type, with a font for each size.

In contemporary computing, however, the terms font and typeface are often used interchangeably to refer to computer fonts, most of which are scalable. While the various sizes of a typeface often use identical letterforms, it is not uncommon for a typeface to feature different design elements to aid readability or impact at especially large or small sizes. Computer fonts are distributed as files. Each file may contain one or more weight and style of a typeface.

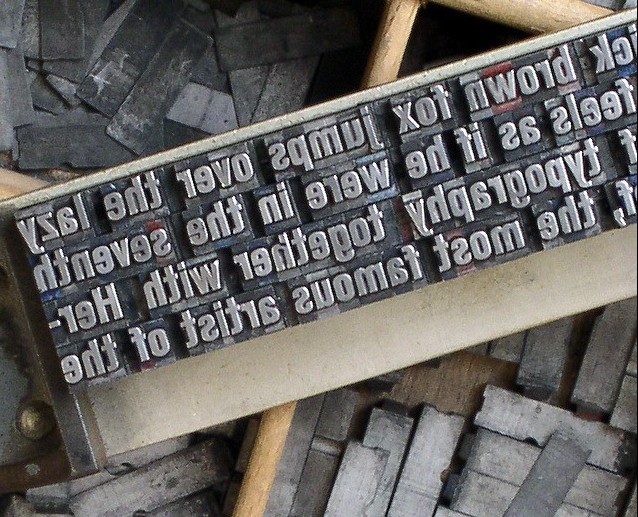
Metal type sorts arranged on a composing stick

== Spelling and etymology ==
The word font (US) or fount (traditional UK; in any case pronounced /fɒnt/) derives from Middle French fonte, meaning "cast iron". The term refers to the process of casting metal type at a type foundry.

The spelling font, originally used only in the United States, is now the accepted one. Fount, historically used in the UK and Commonwealth countries, is considered archaic.

== Metal type ==
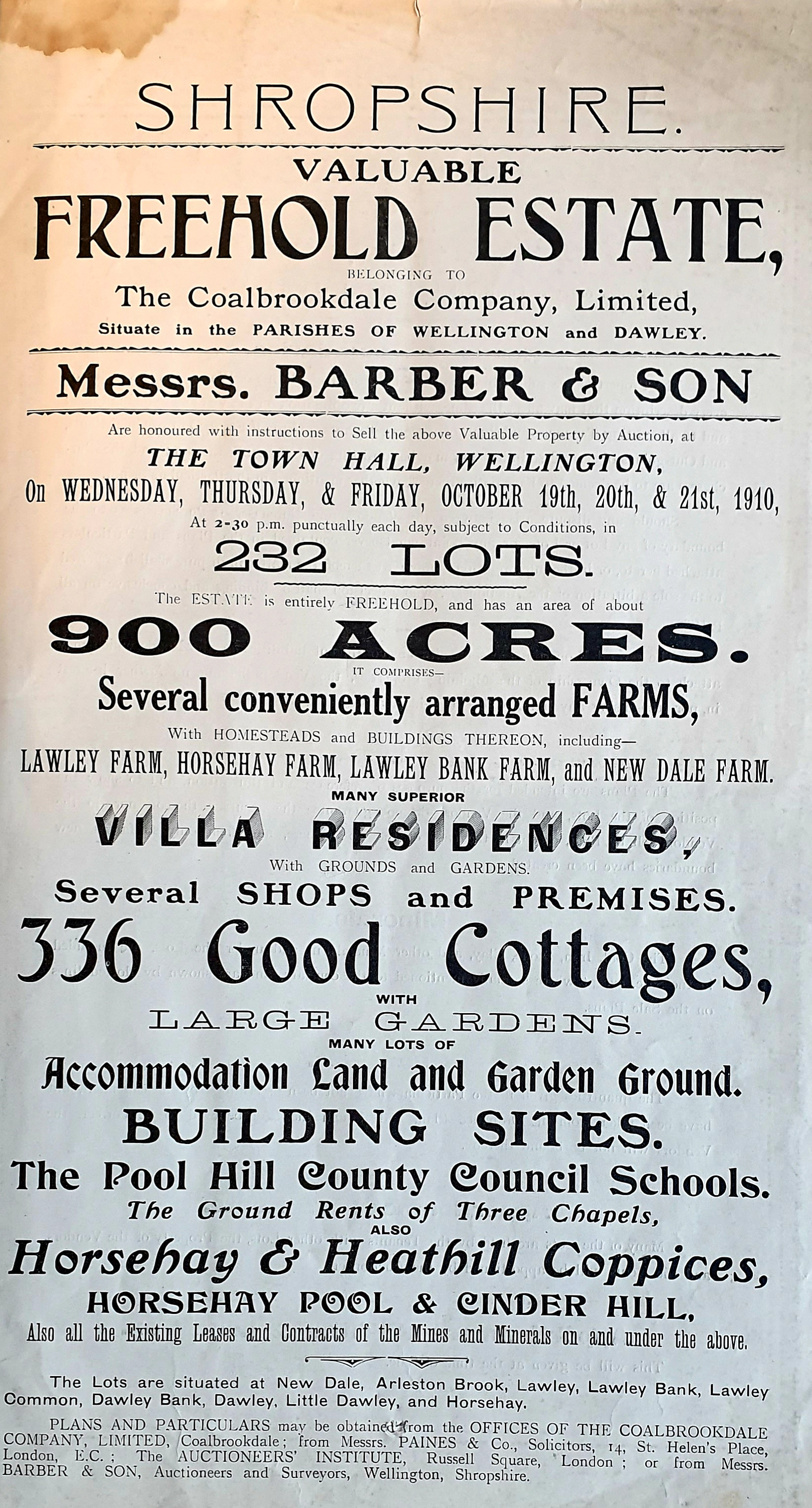
A 1910 letterpress poster, advertising an auction, using a variety of typefaces and fonts

In a manual printing (letterpress) house the word "font" would refer to a complete set of metal type that would be used to typeset an entire page. Upper- and lowercase letters get their names because of which case the metal type was located in for manual typesetting: the more distant upper case or the closer lower case. The same distinction is also referred to with the terms majuscule and minuscule.

Unlike a digital typeface, a metal font would not include a single definition of each character, but commonly used characters (such as vowels and periods) would have more physical type-pieces included. A font when bought new would often be sold as (for example in a Roman alphabet) "12pt 14A 34a", meaning that it would be a size 12-point font containing 14 uppercase "A"s, and 34 lowercase "a"s.

The rest of the characters would be provided in quantities appropriate for the distribution of letters in that language. Some metal type characters required in typesetting, such as dashes, spaces and line-height spacers, were not part of a specific font, but were generic pieces that could be used with any font. Line spacing is still often called "leading", because the strips used for line spacing were made of lead (rather than the harder alloy used for other pieces). This spacing strip was made from lead because lead was a softer metal than the traditional forged metal type pieces (which was part lead, antimony and tin) and would compress more easily when "locked up" in the printing "chase" (i.e. a carrier for holding all the type together).

In the 1880s–1890s, "hot lead" typesetting was invented, in which type was cast as it was set, either piece by piece (as in the Monotype technology) or in entire lines of type at one time (as in the Linotype technology).

== Characteristics ==
In addition to character height, there are several other characteristics which may distinguish fonts, depending on the writing system. In European alphabetic scripts (Latin, Greek, and Cyrillic, or LGC) the main such properties are weight (stroke width), slope (style or angle), and character width (fixed vs. proportional, and condensed vs. wide).

The adjective roman can refer to the upright variant of a font (in contrast to italic or oblique), and is often omitted for brevity. Roman can also refer to a font's language coverage (referring to Latin script).

Font metrics in LGC scripts include vertical measures like x-height, cap height, ascender height, and descender height. Different font styles within the same typeface can be used in a single design to enhance readability and emphasis, or in a specific design to make it of more visual interest. Variations of numerical digits, letters, or other characters may be supplied for various purposes.

== See also ==
- Font embedding – Inclusion of font files inside an electronic document
- Graphics – Visual presentation on some surface
- Intellectual property protection of typefaces
- List of typefaces
- Text color – Contrasting color used for emphasis
