= Body height (typography) =

Height of the space in which a type element is defined

The metal sort: b is the body or shank, c is the body height or font size

In typography, the body height or point size refers to the height of the space in which a glyph is defined.

== Metal typesetting ==
Originally, in metal typesetting, the body height or the font (or point) size was defined by the height of the lead cuboid (metal sort) on which the actual font face is moulded. The body height of a metal sort defined the point size, and was usually slightly larger than the distance between the ascender and descender to allow additional space between the lines of text. More space might be achieved by inserting thin long pieces of lead between the lines of text, called leading.

== Digital fonts ==
In digital fonts, the body is now a virtual, imaginary area, whose height still equals the point size as it did in metal type.

The distance between one baseline and the next is the sum of the body height and the leading, often expressed as characters per inch vertically (as in RFC 678) or lines of text per inch (not to be confused with lines per inch, a measure of printed photograph resolution).

== See also ==
- Body (typography) – Virtual, imaginary area, the space in which a glyph is defined
- Em – Typographic unit equal to the point size
- En – Typographic unit equal to half an em
- Glyph – Purposeful written mark. In typography, the particular style of a grapheme.
- Grapheme – Smallest functional written unit. In typography, a character (letter, number, symbol, punctuation).
- Point (typography) – Measurement unit used in typography
- Small caps – Capital letters the height of a lowercase 'x'
- X-height – Measurement of letters in a typeface
