= Axial pen force =

In graphonomics, Axial pen force is the component of the normal pen force that is parallel to the pen. It is dependent upon pen tilt. In the special case of a perfectly vertical orientation of the writing instrument the axial pen force equals the normal pen force.

== See also ==
- Graphonomics
