= Slovenly =

Slovenly may refer to:

- Slovenly (band), an American post-punk band
- Slovenly (health), the characteristic of a person who neglects health-preserving practices
- Slovenly (penmanship), the characteristic of a graph that includes shape space around an idealized allograph
