= Movement parameter =

Movement parameter may refer to:

- Movement parameter in graphonomics
- Movement parameter in American Sign Language grammar

== See also ==
- Kinesiology, the study of human body movement
