= Lineation =

Lineation may refer to:

- Lineation (handwriting), use of consistent spacing and letter size in Western handwriting to produce straight lines
- Lineation (geology), linear structural features within rocks
  - Parting lineation
- Lineation (poetry), the selective arrangement of text into poetic lines
