= Horizontal progression =

In handwriting, horizontal progression is the gradual movement in the direction of writing across a paper (i.e. left to right for Western alphabets). In some theories of handwriting, it is distinguished from the movements making up individual letters. The speed of horizontal progression can vary.

== See also ==
- Graphonomics
