= Delayed stroke =

Time taken to make a mark

For penmanship, the difference between on-line handwriting recognition and off-line handwriting recognition is that temporal information is present in the on-line pen-tip trajectory Xt, Yt. This means that the order of movements is contained with an on-line recording of handwriting on a Graphics Tablet. In handwriting recognition, the temporal information usually helps to disambiguate between characters that are touching in the image, but which are disparate in the temporal order.

Nevertheless, the time information also introduces problems in cases where the writer goes back and forth over the page. The most common example is putting the dot on a letter i or j, or the horizontal bar of a lower-case letter t. Such an action can be performed either immediately after writing a letter or can be delayed to a later moment. There are different strategies. Some writers produce the dots after finishing a word while others finish a complete sentence or even paragraph of text before producing the delayed strokes for dots and bars. Whereas the optical result may appear impeccable, an on-line handwriting recognition system must attribute each delayed stroke to the correct character in the production sequence.

The delayed stroke illustrates that knowing the temporal stroke order is not always helpful in the handwriting recognition process.

== See also ==
- Graphonomics
