= Johannes Philippus de Lignamine =

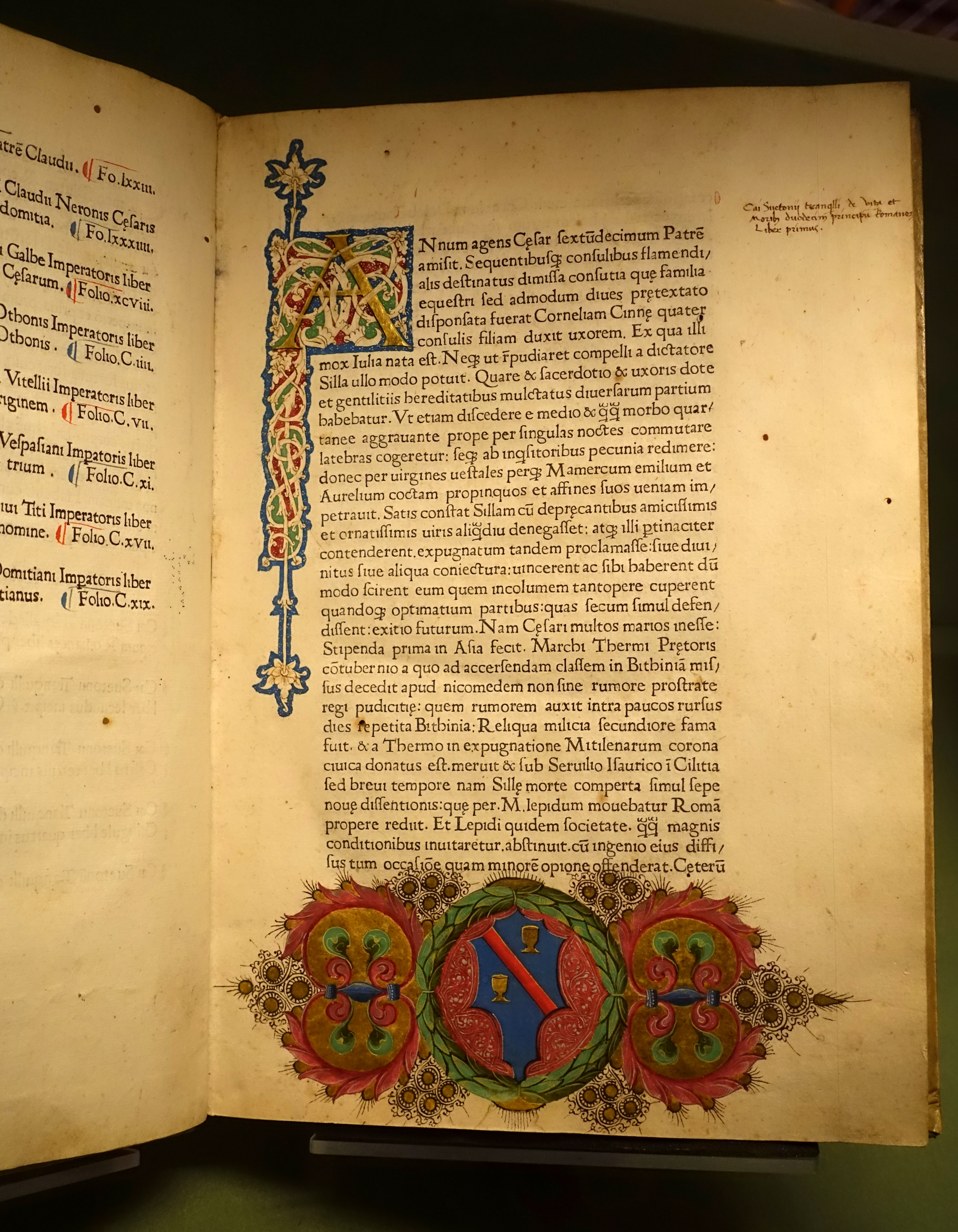
Edition of Suetonius' De vita Caesarum, edited by Gianantonio Campano and printed by Lignamine

Johannes Philippus de Lignamine (1420 – ??) was a Sicilian printer/publisher and tax collector from Messina active at Monte Cassino near Rome and a courtier to Pope Sixtus IV. He is best known for his publication of Herbarium Apuleii Platonici in 1481.

While Italy was the first country to use Johannes Gutenberg's new printing techniques, it was also the first country in which the German monopoly of the printing industry was lost. On 3 August 1470 the Institutio Oratoria, a book by Marcus Fabius Quintilianus (AD30-AD96) was typeset on an Italian press operated by Johannes Philippus de Lignamine. This first edition was edited by Giovanni Antonio Campani and was based on a corrupt copy of the manuscript found by Poggio Bracciolini.

Research by Margaret M. Smith concluded that de Lignamine was the first printer to use small capitals.
