= Small caps =

Capital letters the height of a lowercase 'x'

Small caps, petite caps and italic used for emphasis

True small caps (top), compared with scaled small caps (bottom), generated by OpenOffice.org Writer

In typography, small caps (short for small capitals) are letters or other symbols that have the graphic form of uppercase letters but which are typeset at a smaller size, approaching or matching the height of lowercase letters or text figures in the text. For example, the text "quick" appears as quick in small caps. Setting text "in small caps" often implies transforming the lowercase letters but leaving the true capitals the same; for instance "The quick brown Mr Fox" would become The quick brown Mr Fox. Small caps are used in running text as a form of emphasis that is less dominant than all uppercase text, and as a method of emphasis or distinctiveness for text alongside or instead of italics, or when boldface is inappropriate. Small caps can be used to draw attention to the opening phrase or line of a new section of text, or to provide an additional style in a dictionary entry where many parts must be typographically differentiated.

== Design ==
Well-designed small capitals are not simply scaled-down versions of normal capitals; they normally retain the same stroke weight as other letters and have a wider aspect ratio for readability.

Typically, the height of a small capital glyph will be one ex, the same height as most lowercase characters in the font. In fonts with relatively low x-height, however, small caps may be somewhat larger than this. For example, in some Tiro Typeworks fonts, small caps glyphs are 30% larger than x-height, and 70% the height of full capitals. To differentiate between these two alternatives, the x-height form is sometimes called petite caps, preserving the name "small caps" for the larger variant. OpenType fonts can define both forms via the "small caps" and the "petite caps" features. When the support for the petite caps feature is absent from a desktop publishing program, x-height small caps are often substituted.

Many word processors and text formatting systems include an option to format text in caps and small caps, which leaves uppercase letters as they are, but converts lowercase letters to small caps. How this is implemented depends on the typesetting system; some can use true small caps glyphs that are included in modern professional typefaces; but less complex computer fonts do not have small-caps glyphs, so the typesetting system simply reduces the uppercase letters by a fraction (often 1.5 to 2 points less than the base scale). However, this will make the characters look somewhat out of proportion. A work-around to simulate real small capitals is to use a bolder version of the small caps generated by such systems, to match well with the normal weights of capitals and lowercase, especially when such small caps are extended about 5% or letter-spaced a half point or a point.

== Uses ==
Sometimes, small caps are used to indicate an emphasis stronger than italics, but less than all caps. (Note: "I am inclined to think, but of this I do not give a judicial opinion, that the direct taxes contemplated by the Constitution, are only two, to wit, a capitation, or poll tax, simply, without regard to property, profession, or any other circumstance; and a tax on land.") (Note: "[Bank notes] are not goods, not securities, nor documents for debts, nor are so esteemed: but are treated as money, as cash, in the ordinary course and transaction of business, by the general consent of mankind; which gives them the credit and currency of money, to all intents and purposes.") Small caps are also often used, however, in sections of text that are unremarkable, where a run of uppercase capital letters might imply an emphasis that is not intended. For example, the style of some publications, like The New Yorker and The Economist, is to use small caps for acronyms and initialisms longer than three letters—thus "U.S." and "W.H.O." in normal caps but "nato" in small caps.

The initialisms ad, ce, am, and pm are sometimes typeset in small caps.

In printed plays small caps are used for stage directions and the names of characters before their lines.

Some publications use small caps to indicate surnames. An elementary example is Don Quixote de La Mancha. In the 21st century, the practice is gaining traction in scientific publications.

In many versions of the Old Testament of the Bible, the word "Lord" is set in small caps. Typically, an ordinary "Lord" corresponds to the use of the word Adonai in the original Hebrew, but the small caps "Lord" corresponds to the use of Yahweh in the original; in some versions the compound "Lord God" represents the Hebrew compound Adonai Yahweh.

In zoological and botanical nomenclature, small caps are occasionally used for genera and families.

In computational complexity theory, a sub-field of computer science, the formal names of algorithmic problems, e.g. MᴀxSAT, are sometimes set in small caps.

Linguists use small caps to analyze the morphology and tag (gloss) the parts of speech in a sentence; e.g.,

She love-s you.
3SG.F.NOM love-3SG.PRS.IND 2

Linguists also use small caps to refer to the keywords in lexical sets for particular languages or dialects; e.g. the fleece and trap vowels in English.

The Bluebook prescribes small caps for some titles and names in United States legal citations. The practice precedes World War I, with Harvard Law Review using it while referring to itself. By 1915, small caps were used for all titles of journals and books.

In many books, mention of another part of the same book or mentions the work as a whole will be set in small caps. For example, articles in The World Book Encyclopedia refer to the encyclopedia as a whole and to the encyclopedia's other articles in small caps, as in the "Insurance" article's direction, at one point, to "See No-Fault Insurance", "No-Fault Insurance" being another of the encyclopedia's articles.

Among Romance languages, as an orthographic tradition, only the French and Spanish languages render Roman numerals in small caps to denote centuries, e.g. xviii^{e} siècle and siglo xviii for "18th century"; the numerals are cardinally postpositive in Spanish alone.

In a name with unusual capitalization like "LeBron", in an all caps context, some of the lowercase letters may be set in small caps to preserve the orthographic information ("LeBRON").

The first word or phrase of a chapter of a book or article may be in small caps, especially if following a drop cap.

== History ==
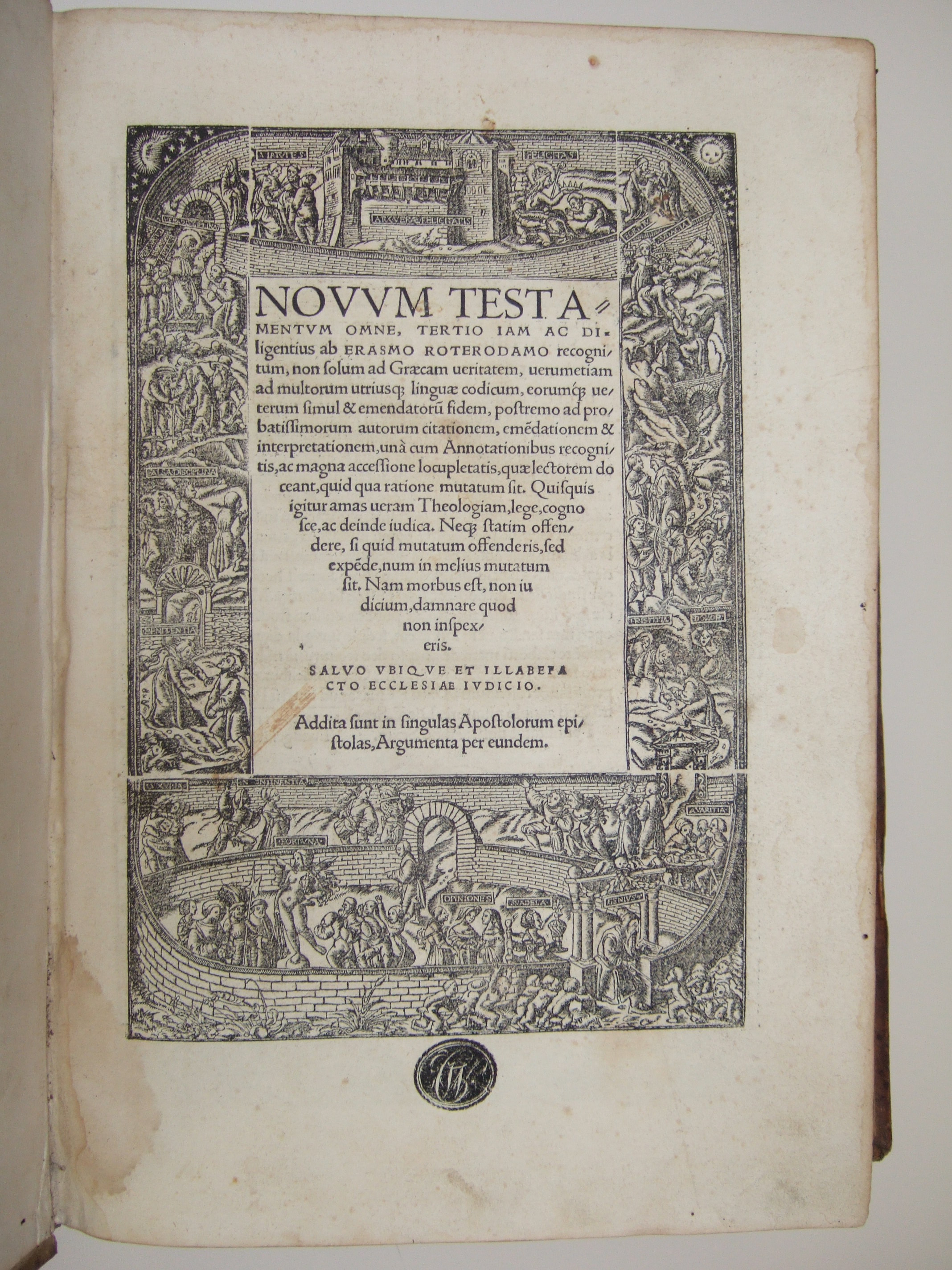
Small caps used by Johann Froben in the 1516 Novum instrumentum

Research by Margaret M. Smith concluded that the use of small caps was probably popularised by Johann Froben in the early 16th century, who used them extensively from 1516. Froben may have been influenced by Aldus Manutius, who used very small capitals with printing Greek and at the start of lines of italic, copying a style common in manuscripts at the time, and sometimes used these capitals to set headings in his printing; as a result these headings were in all caps, but in capitals from a smaller font than the body text type. The idea caught on in France, where small capitals were used by Simon de Colines, Robert Estienne and Claude Garamond. Johannes Philippus de Lignamine used small caps in the 1470s, but apparently was not copied at the time.

Small capitals are not found in all font designs, as traditionally in printing they were primarily used within the body text of books and so are often not found in fonts that are not intended for this purpose, such as sans-serif types which historically were not preferred for book printing. Fonts in Use reports that Gert Wunderlich's Maxima (1970), for Typoart, was "maybe the first sans serif to feature small caps and optional oldstyle numerals across all weights." (Some caps-only typefaces intended for printing stationery, for instance Copperplate Gothic and Bank Gothic, were intended to be used with smaller sizes serving as small capitals, and had no lower case as a result.)

Italic small capitals were historically rarer than roman small caps. Some digital font families, sometimes digitisations of older metal type designs, still only have small caps in roman style and do not have small caps in bold or italic styles. This is again because small caps were normally only used in body text and cutting bold and italic small caps was thought unnecessary. An isolated early appearance was in the Enschedé type foundry specimen of 1768, which featured a set cut by Joan Michaël Fleischman, and in 1837 Thomas Adams commented that in the United States "small capitals are in general only cast to roman fonts" but that "some founders in England cast italic small capitals to most, if not the whole of their fonts." (Note: Spelling and capitalisation modernised.) (Bold type did not appear until the nineteenth century.) In 1956, Hugh Williamson's textbook Methods of Book Design noted that "one of the most conspicuous defects" of contemporary book faces was that they did not generally feature italic small capitals: "these would certainly be widely used if they were generally available". Exceptions available at the time were Linotype's Pilgrim, Janson and their release of Monotype Garamond, and from Monotype Romulus. More have appeared in the digital period, such as in Hoefler Text and FF Scala.

== Computer support ==
=== Fonts ===
The OpenType font standard provides support for transformations from normal letters to small caps by two feature tags, smcp and c2sc. A font may use the tag smcp to indicate how to transform lower-case letters to small caps, and the tag c2sc to indicate how to transform upper-case letters to small caps. OpenType provides support for transformations from normal letters to petite caps by two feature tags, pcap and c2pc. A font may use the tag pcap to indicate how to transform lower-case letters to petite caps, and the tag c2pc to indicate how to transform upper-case letters to petite caps.

Desktop publishing applications, as well as web browsers, can use these features to display petite caps. However, only a few currently do so. LibreOffice can use the fontname:pcap=1 method.

=== Word processors ===
Professional desktop publishing applications supporting genuine small caps include Quark XPress, and Adobe Creative Suite applications.

Most word processing applications, including Microsoft Word and Pages, do not automatically substitute true small caps when working with OpenType fonts that include them, instead generating scaled ones. For these applications it is therefore easier to work with fonts that have true small caps as a completely separate style, similar to bold or italic. Few free and open-source fonts have this feature; an exception is Georg Duffner's EB Garamond, in open beta. LibreOffice Writer started allowing true small caps for OpenType fonts since version 5.3, they can be enabled via a syntax used in the Font Name input box, including font name, a colon, feature tag, an equals sign and feature value, for example, EB Garamond 12:smcp=1, and version 6.2 added a dialog to switch.

=== Unicode ===
In orthography, small caps are allographs of capital letters. Unicode defines a number of small-capital (or, more accurately, petite-capital) characters for specialized use such as phonetic notation. They are deprecated as substitutes for small-cap formatting; rather, the basic character set should be used with suitable formatting controls as described in the preceding sections. (Note: Normal text set with these characters suffers from a number of deficiencies: Some letters, including the standard English letter X, have no corresponding "small capital" character; hard-coded small caps are not generally intelligible to the screen readers used by blind people; nor, typically, is text set using these characters recognized by general-purpose translation or text-searching tools.)

The Unicode petite-capital characters are found in the IPA extensions, Phonetic Extensions, Latin Extended-D and other blocks. These characters are intended for use in notation where they are semantically distinct – that is, for cases where they are not allographs. For example, petite capital ⟨ʀ⟩ represents a uvular trill in IPA, and ⟨ɢ⟩ a voiced uvular plosive; capital ⟨R⟩ and ⟨G⟩ have no defined meaning in IPA, but are commonly used as wildcards for 'resonant' and 'glide'. Thus using formatting to replicate ⟨ʀ⟩ would not be appropriate in phonetic notation, because if the formatting were lost, data would be lost and the text would change in meaning.

A small-cap W may be distinct from a lowercase w in italic typeface, as in this obsolete Americanist phonetic notation.

The petite-capital characters defined by Unicode for letters of the basic Latin alphabet are as follows. Grey-shaded cells mark missing petite capitals that are not very distinct from minuscules in roman typeface, but may be distinct in italic typeface, as is used in some phonetic notation.

Basic Latin small capitals
	A	B	C	D	E	F	G	H	I	J	K	L	M	N	O	P	Q	R	S	T	U	V	W	X	Y	Z
baseline	ᴀ	ʙ	ᴄ	ᴅ	ᴇ	ꜰ	ɢ	ʜ	ɪ	ᴊ	ᴋ	ʟ	ᴍ	ɴ	ᴏ	ᴘ	ꞯ	ʀ	ꜱ	ᴛ	ᴜ	ᴠ	ᴡ	–	ʏ	ᴢ
superscript	𝿩*	𐞄		𝿨*	𝿪*	–	𐞒	𐞖	ᶦ	–	𞀹^{§}	ᶫ	𞀻^{§}	ᶰ		𝿑*	–	𐞪		𞁀^{§}	ᶸ				𐞲	
overscript**	–	◌ⷡ ^{§}		–	–	–	◌ᷛ	◌ⷩ ^{§}	–	–	◌ⷦ ^{§}	◌ᷞ	◌ᷟ	◌ᷡ		–	–	◌ᷢ		◌ⷮ ^{§}	–				–	

* Superscript versions of petite-capital ᴀ, ᴅ, ᴇ and ᴘ were released with version 18 of the Unicode Standard in September 2026, and are only supported by a few fonts.

** Although the overscript (combining superscript) characters are identified as 'small capitals' in Unicode, there are no corresponding capital overscript characters that they contrast with.

^{§} Cyrillic 𞀹 𞀻 𞁀 and ◌ⷡ ◌ⷩ ◌ⷦ ◌ⷮ might be substituted for these letters.

Additionally, a few less-common Latin characters and several Greek characters also have petite capitals encoded:

Extended Latin small capitals (Note: Two of the petite capitals, ʁ and ꭆ, have no corresponding capital letter in Unicode. Two of the superscript petite capitals, 𐞀 and ꟸ, have no corresponding baseline petite capitals in Unicode.)
	Ꜳ	Æ	(Ƀ)	Ð	Ǝ	Ɠ	ᵷ (⅁)	Ħ	Ɨ	Ʞ	Ł	Ɬ	ŋ (И)	Œ	Ɔ	Ȣ	(Я)	ɹ (ꓤ)	–	–	ꝵ	Ʉ	Ɯ	Ʒ
baseline	–	ᴁ	ᴃ	ᴆ	ⱻ	ʛ	𝼂	–	ᵻ	𝼐	ᴌ	𝼄	ᴎ	ɶ	ᴐ	ᴕ	ᴙ	ᴚ	ʁ	ꭆ	ꝶ	ᵾ	ꟺ	ᴣ
superscript	𐞀					𐞔		ꟸ*	ᶧ			𐞜		𐞣					ʶ					

* ꟸ is not technically a superscript Ħ, but it is rendered that way in many fonts.

Greek small capitals (Note: Supported letters, plus those that cannot be substituted with Latin. Unicode includes them in phonetic-symbol and Latin blocks.)
	Γ	Δ	Θ	Λ	Ξ	Π	Ρ	Σ	Φ	Ψ	Ω
baseline	ᴦ	*	–	ᴧ	–	ᴨ	ᴩ	–	–	ᴪ	ꭥ

The UPA small-cap ᴫ (left) and lower-case л (right) are distinct in italic typeface, which is how the UPA is typeset.

There is little call for small caps in Cyrillic, as there would be little graphic difference between small caps and lowercase. However, Unicode does provide for one small cap Cyrillic letter for use in the Uralic Phonetic Alphabet (UPA), where small caps and lowercase are distinct in italic typeface:

Cyrillic small capitals (for use in Latin text) (Note: The petite-capital Cyrillic letter may be indistinguishable from the lowercase in roman typeface. However, it is distinct in its italic form, which is how it is normally typeset in phonetic notation.)
	Л
baseline	ᴫ

==== Labels ====
The Unicode Consortium has a typographical convention of using small caps for its formal names for symbols, in running text. For example, the name of U+0416 Ж is conventionally shown as CYRILLIC CAPITAL LETTER ZHE.

=== CSS ===
Small caps can be specified in the style sheet language CSS using font-variant: small-caps. For example,

Basic small caps (CSS2)
Code	Render
<span style="font-variant: small-caps">Jane Doe</span>	Jane Doe
<span style="font-variant: small-caps">AaBbCcDdEeFf</span>	AaBbCcDdEeFf

Since CSS styles the text, and no actual case transformation is applied, readers are still able to copy the normally-capitalized plain text from the web page as rendered by a browser.

CSS3 can specify OpenType small caps (given the smcp feature in the font replaces glyphs with proper small caps glyphs) by using font-variant-caps: small-caps, which is the recommended way, or font-feature-settings: 'smcp', which is the most widely used method as of May 2014. For the latter case, if the font does not have small-cap glyphs, lowercase letters are displayed.

Small caps (CSS3)
Code	Render
<span style="font-variant-caps: small-caps">Jane Doe</span> technically identical to font-variant: small-caps	Jane Doe
<span style="font-feature-settings: 'smcp'">AaBbCcDdEeFf</span>	AaBbCcDdEeFf

As of June 2023, CSS3 can specify petite caps by using font-variant: petite-caps or font-feature-settings: 'pcap'. For the latter case, if the font does not have petite cap glyphs, lowercase letters are displayed. For the first case, small caps are substituted.

Petite caps (CSS3)
Code	Render
<span style="font-variant-caps: petite-caps">Jane Doe</span> technically identical to font-variant: petite-caps	Jane Doe
<span style="font-feature-settings: 'pcap'">AaBbCcDdEeFf</span>	AaBbCcDdEeFf

== See also ==
- All caps – Text with all capital letters
- Alphabet 26 – Typeface designed by Bradbury Thompson
- CamelCase – Writing format
- Mixed case – Using uppercase for a word's first letter, or using uppercase at all
- Small capital F
