= Cap height =

Height of a capital letter above the baseline

Typography Height

In typography, cap height is the height of a capital letter above the baseline for a particular typeface. It specifically is the height of capital letters that are flat—such as H or I—as opposed to round letters such as O, or pointed letters like A, both of which may display overshoot. The height of the small letters is the x-height.

== See also ==
- Body height (typography)
