= Sloppiness space =

In graphonomics, sloppiness space is a term introduced by David Goldberg and Cate Richardson of Xerox to describe the shape space of all graph (handwriting) around an idealized allograph. Sloppiness space can be so large that optical character recognition becomes difficult due to overlap with shapes for non-intended characters.

== Definition ==
Goldberg and Richardson's system is related to unistrokes, or one-stroke forms, for handwritten characters. They write that a unistroke letter that is described by d features can be thought of as representing a point in a d-dimensional space. Two characters are well-separated in "sloppiness space" when the variation caused by writing a letter more quickly only results in small changes in the position in that d—dimensional space.

Subsequent researchers have further explored the concept using autoregressive models.

== Xerox case ==
The concept of sloppiness space was discussed in a 1997 lawsuit in which Xerox sued 3Com, alleging that 3Com's "Graffiti" technology to interpret handwriting text, used in their PalmPilot devices, infringed upon a patent by Xerox of technology to do the same. The court ruled that the concept, as defined, was ambiguous.
