= Pen tilt =

Pen tilt refers to the angle of a writing instrument during handwriting and drawing, which can vary over time. In a coordinate system which is determined by the writing surface plane $\{X,Y\}$ and the vertical pen-tip movement along the $\{Z\}$ axis, all three two-dimensional planes can be discerned, and the angular signals can be delivered by a digitizer. It is part of the ISO/IEC standard 19794-7 for biometric data in signatures.

== See also ==
- Graphonomics
