= Overshoot (microwave communication) =

Unintended reception of microwave signals

Overshoot is the unintended reception of microwave signals in microwave communication, occurring as a result of an unusual ionospheric conditions.

== See also ==
- Federal Standard 1037C
- MIL-STD-188
