= Mean line =

Term used in typography

In typography, the mean line is the imaginary line at the top of the x-height.

Round glyphs will tend to break (overshoot) the mean line slightly in many typefaces, since this is aesthetically more pleasing, otherwise curved letters such as a, c, e, m, n, o, r, s, and u will appear visually smaller than flat-topped (or bottomed) characters of equal height, due to an optical illusion.
