= EB Garamond =

Typeface family

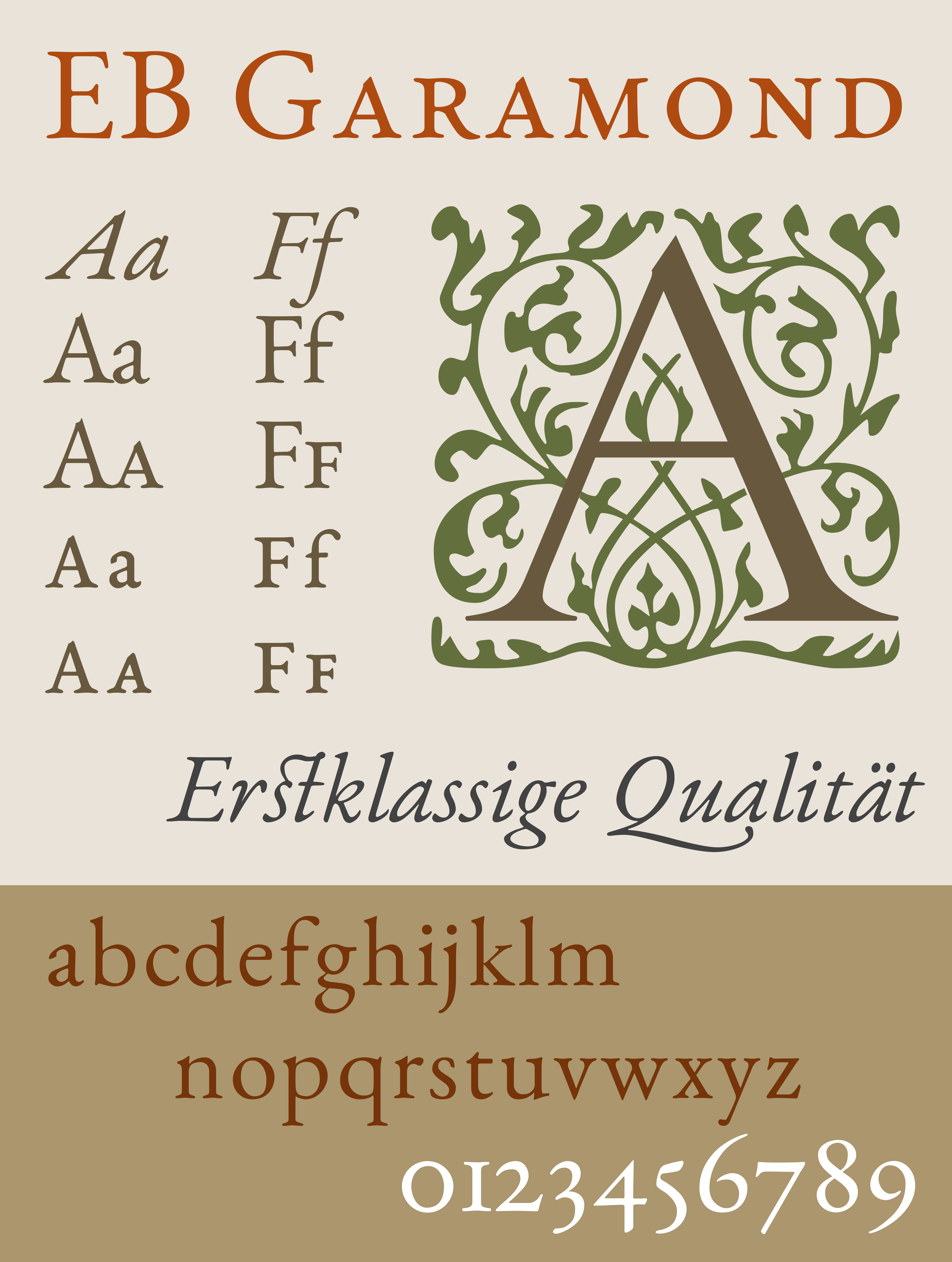
- Category: Serif
- Classification: Old-style; Garalde
- Designers: Claude Garamont, Robert Granjon, Georg Mayr-Duffner, Octavio Pardo and others
- Date released: 2011
- Glyphs: 3,218
- License: OFL
- Website: Download from Octavio Pardo’s repository Georg Mayr-Duffner about EB Garamond
- Latest release date: 29 October 2017

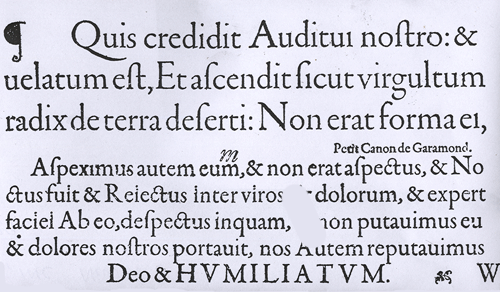
A part of the Egenolff–Berner specimen printed in 1592 showing the original cuts by Garamont and Granjon (the second type, mislabelled as "Petit Canon de Garamond")

EB Garamond is a free and open source implementation of Claude Garamond’s typeface, Garamond, with matching italic characters designed by Robert Granjon. Its name is a shortening of Egenolff–Berner Garamond; the letter forms are taken from the Egenolff–Berner specimen printed in 1592.

The font family covers Latin, Greek, Cyrillic, and International Phonetic Alphabet (IPA) glyphs.

== Implementation history ==
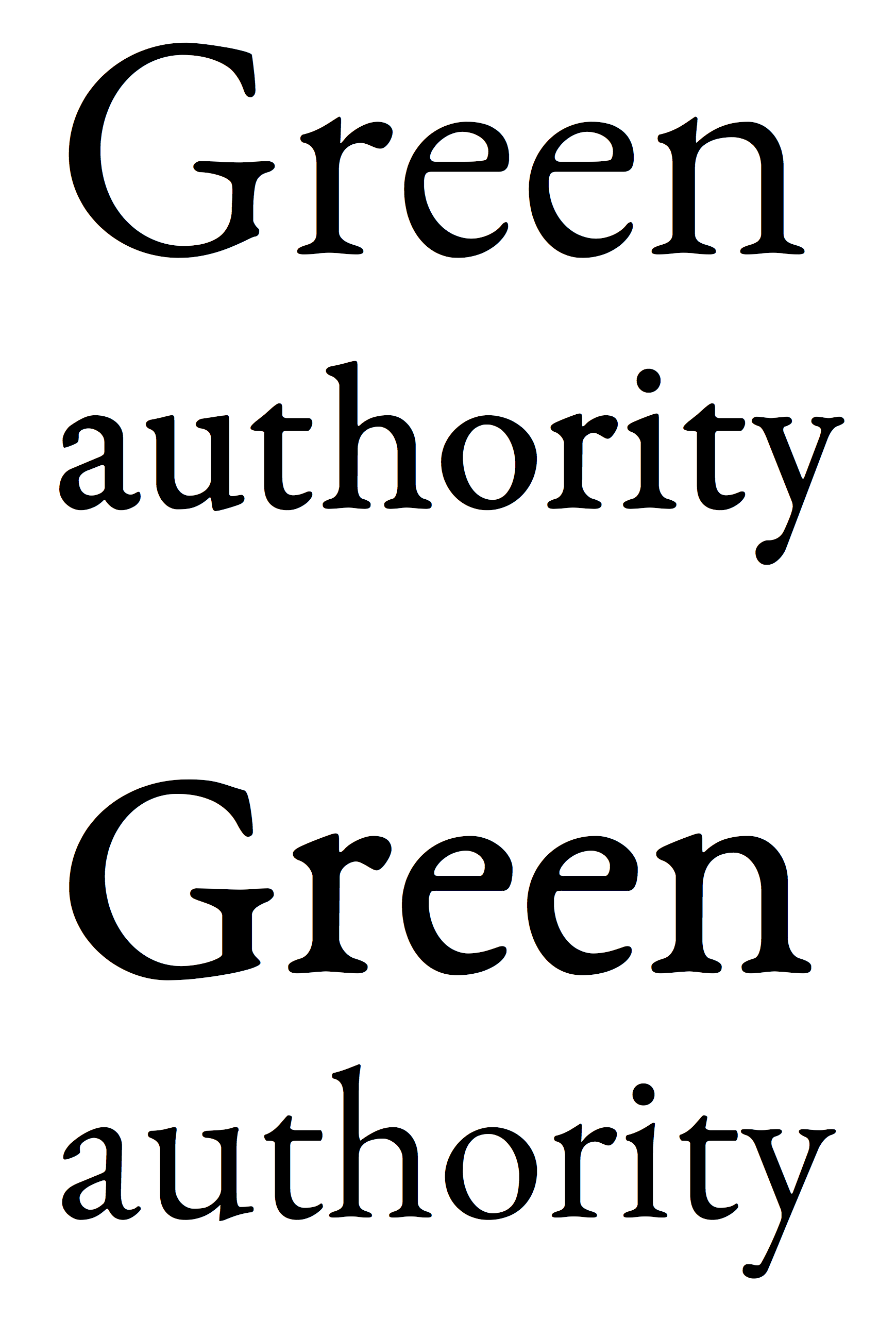
Illustration of the right (upper example) and the wrong (lower example) use of the optical sizes

In 2011 the Austrian designer Georg Mayr-Duffner released the EB Garamond under the Open Font License. Mayr-Duffner took the letterforms from a scan of a specimen known as the “Berner specimen” which was printed in 1592 by Conrad Berner, son-in-law of Christian Egenolff and his successor at the Egenolff print office. It shows Garamont's roman and Granjon's italic fonts at different sizes. The Greek characters were initially based on Robert Granjon's work, but Mayr-Duffner planned to modify their designs. In addition, the font includes OpenType features such as swash italic capitals and schoolbook alternates.

Duffner's intention was to include multiple optical sizes. As of 2014 his implementation included fonts based on the 8 and 12 point forms from the 1592 specimen, but lacked the bold font faces. As Georg Mayr-Duffner couldn't complete the bold weights for personal reasons, Google commissioned the Spanish type designer Octavio Pardo to continue the project. As of 2018 Pardo's implementation includes 5 weights (Regular, Medium, Semi-Bold, Bold and Extra-Bold), both in regular and italic style.

=== Technical details ===
Mayr-Duffner implemented the EB Garamond originally in FontForge using the SFDIR and UFO format. Octavio Pardo switched to the proprietary font editor Glyphs that supports multiple master fonts. Pardo's implementation is hence based on two masters, Regular and Bold. The other weights are generated from the masters. The letter forms and the kerning of Pardo's Regular are identical with Mayr-Duffner's EB Garamond 12. The source of the fonts is drawn with cubic Bézier curves, thus the OTF-version (CFF-style) version of the compiled fonts should be preferred over the TTF-version, as TTF requires quadratic Bézier curves which have to be generated by lossy conversion during the compilation from the source files.

=== EBGaramond-Maths ===
EBGaramond-Maths is a package for LaTeX that provides a version of the EB Garamond 12 for mathematics. Its maintainer is Clea F. Rees.

=== Garamond-Math ===
Garamond-Math is an additional OpenType font file for the EB Garamond family containing symbols for mathematics. The file is provided by Yuansheng Zhao.

=== EB Garamond Initials ===
In 2023 a separate font of decorative initials was released, based on the illuminated capitals in De Peste Commentarius (1589) by the French abbot, Jean Antoine Sarrasin.

== OpenType features ==
Illustration of the short-tailed versus the long-tailed Q. The long-tailed Q is part of the Stylistic Set 6.

As of 2018, EB Garamond includes the following OpenType features:

aalt	Access All Alternates	lnum	Lining Figures	ss02	Stylistic Set 2
c2pc	Petite Capitals From Capitals	mark	Mark Positioning	ss03	Stylistic Set 3
c2sc	Small Capitals From Capitals	mkmk	Mark to Mark Positioning	ss04	Stylistic Set 4
case	Case-Sensitive Forms	onum	Oldstyle Figures	ss05	Stylistic Set 5
dlig	Discretionary Ligatures	ordn	Ordinals	ss06	Stylistic Set 6
frac	Fractions	pcap	Petite Capitals	ss07	Stylistic Set 7
hist	Historical Forms	pnum	Proportional Figures	subs	Subscript
hlig	Historical Ligatures	sinf	Scientific Inferiors	sups	Superscript
kern	Kerning	smcp	Small Capitals	swsh	Swash
liga	Standard Ligatures	ss01	Stylistic Set 1	tnum	Tabular Figures

The feature list and additional information can be obtained by tools like otfinfo (e.g. otfinfo -f `kpsewhich EBGaramond-Regular.otf`) or FontDrop!.

== Economy ==
A comparison of different fonts found that Garamond (not EB Garamond specifically) was significantly more economical of toner or ink than most others, including some designed specifically for economy, though Garamond also sets smaller at the same nominal point size.

== Reception ==
The prominent typeface designer Erik Spiekermann described the EB Garamond as "one of the best open source fonts".

== Availability ==
=== Web ===
- Georg Mayr-Duffner's implementation lacking the bold faces is available from his GitHub repository. It is still possible to generate font files from that repository using OpenBSD or Linux.
- Octavio Pardo's newer version can be downloaded as OTF and TTF files from his repository.
- Pardo's version is also available for embedding through Google Fonts and through Adobe Fonts.

=== LaTeX ===
==== As Classic LaTeX font ====
EB Garamond is also distributed via the CTAN mirrors as LaTeX font package. Therefore, it can be easily applied to LaTeX based documents by adding \usepackage{ebgaramond} to the document preamble. Unfortunately the classic LaTeX font system cannot make use of all characters and OpenType features offered by EB Garamond, but this can be solved by using the XeTeX smart font subsystem.

==== Through XeTeX ====
Nowadays LaTeX supports the three smart font technologies OpenType, AAT and Graphite directly through XeTeX, which has to be activated in one's LaTeX editor. Using the editor LyX, this can be done by checking a box under LyX > Document > Settings > […] use XeTeX. This means adding \use_non_tex_fonts true to the header of the .lyx document files. Then all OpenType, AAT and Graphite fonts installed locally on your OS can be used directly.

In order to access the smart font features of EB Garamond, some code has to be added to the document preamble. E.g. to set EB Garamond as the document main font using old-style figures and the OpenType Stylistic Set 6 (long-tailed Q), the following code can be used:

\usepackage{fontspec}
\setmainfont{EB Garamond}[Numbers={OldStyle;Proportional},RawFeature={+ss06}]

Another method to achieve the same result is the following specification:

\usepackage{fontspec}
\setmainfont{EB Garamond}[RawFeature={+onum;+pnum;+ss06}]
