= Ascender (typography) =

Portion of a minuscule letter

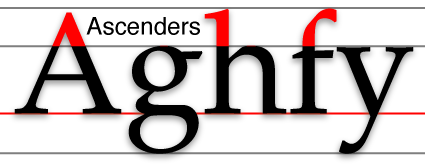
Examples of ascenders.

In typography and handwriting, an ascender is the portion of a minuscule letter in a Latin-derived alphabet that extends above the mean line of a font. That is, the part of a lower-case letter that is taller than the font's x-height.

Ascenders, together with descenders, increase the recognizability of words. For this reason, many situations that require high legibility such as road signs avoid using solely capital letters (i.e. all-caps).

Studies made at the start of the construction of the British motorway network concluded that words with mixed-case letters were much easier to read than "all-caps" and a special font was designed for motorway signs. These then became universal across the UK. See Road signs in the United Kingdom.

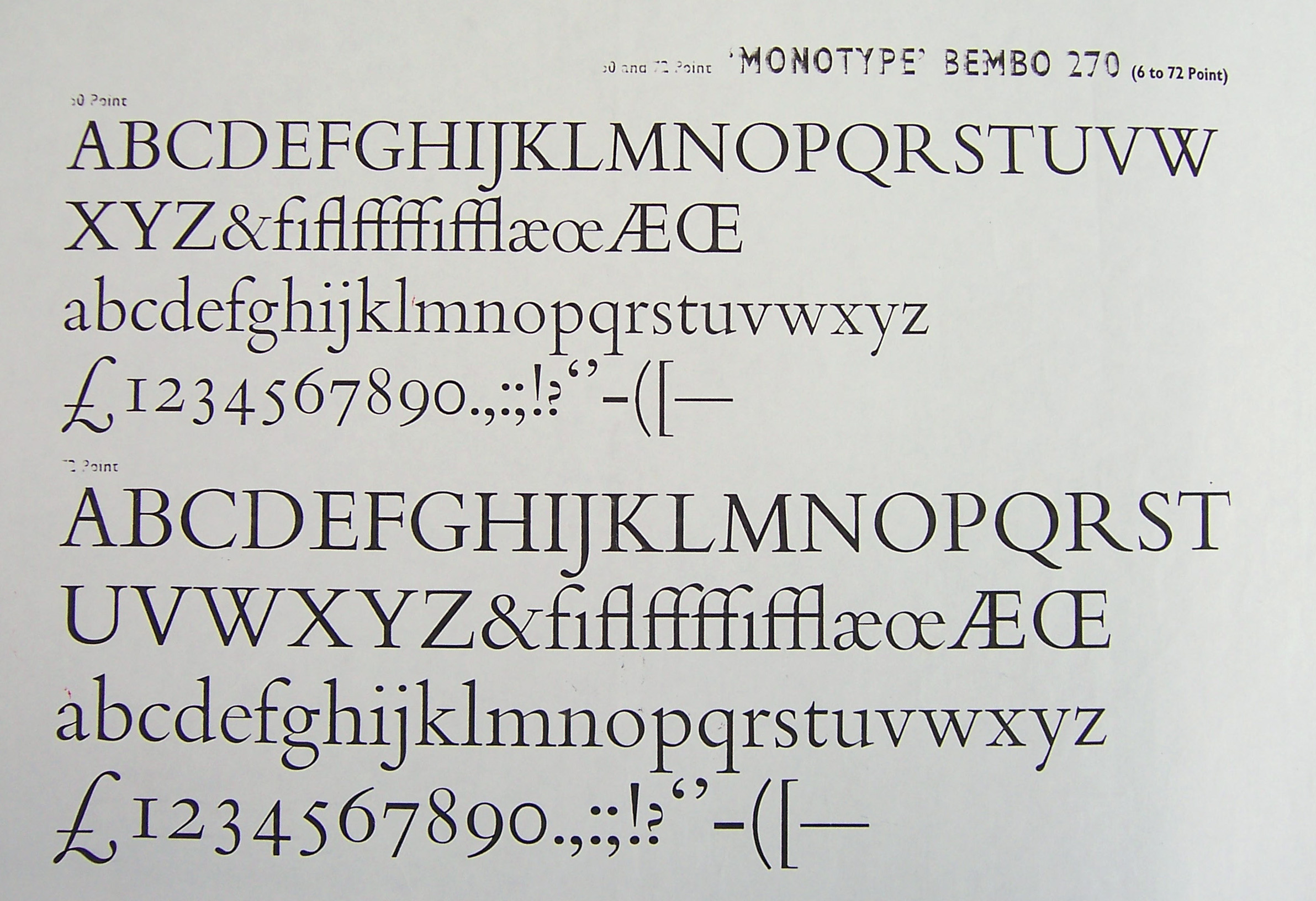
The font Bembo in metal type. Ascenders such as the "f" stand far above the cap line.

In many fonts intended for body text, such as Bembo and Garamond, ascenders rise above the cap height of the capital letters.

The ascenders are the parts of lowercase characters that lie above the mean line. For broader context, see Typeface anatomy.
