= Overshoot (typography) =

High and low points of some letters

Overshoot is the degree that capital letters go below the baseline or above the cap height, and lowercase letters go below the baseline or above the mean line.

In typeface design, the overshoot of a round or pointed letter (like O or A) is the degree to which it extends higher or lower than a comparably sized "flat" letter (like X or H), to achieve an optical effect of being the same size; it compensates for inaccuracies in human visual perception.

Formally, overshoot is the degree to which capital letters go below the baseline or above the cap height, or to which a lowercase letter goes below the baseline or above the x-height.

For example, the highest and lowest extent of the capital O will typically exceed those of the capital X. Although the extent of overshoot varies depending on the design and the designer, perhaps 1% to 3% of the cap or x-height is typical for O. Peter Karow's Digital Formats for Typefaces recommends 3% for O and 5% for A.

== Similar design ==
Typefaces are born from the struggle between rules and results. Squeezing a square about 1% helps it look more like a square; to appear the same height as a square, a circle must be measurably taller. The two strokes in an X aren't the same thickness, nor are their parallel edges actually parallel; the vertical stems of a lowercase alphabet are thinner than those of its capitals; the ascender on a d isn't the same length as the descender on a p, and so on. For the rational mind, type design can be a maddening game of drawing things differently in order to make them appear the same.

— Jonathan Hoefler & Tobias Frere-Jones

Similar subtle adjustments to create an even appearance occur in other fields. For example, in the game of go, the stones, which are black and white, are of slightly different sizes (black slightly larger), to give the appearance of being the same size.
