= Descender =

Portion of a letter that extends below the baseline of a font or script

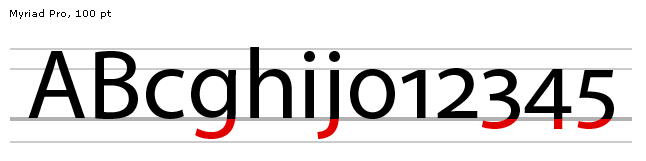
Descenders are parts of a character that lie below the baseline.

In typography and handwriting, a descender is the portion of a grapheme that extends below the baseline of a font.

For example, in the letter y, the descender is the "tail", or that portion of the diagonal line which lies below the v created by the two lines converging. In the letter p, it is the stem reaching down past the ɒ.

In most fonts, descenders are reserved for lowercase characters such as g, j, q, p, y, and sometimes f. Some fonts, however, also use descenders for some numerals (typically 3, 4, 5, 7, and 9). Such numerals are called old-style numerals. (Some italic fonts, such as Computer Modern italic, put a descender on the numeral 4 but not on any other numerals. Such fonts are not considered old-style.) Some fonts also use descenders for the tails on a few uppercase letters such as J and Q.

The parts of characters that extend above the x-height of a font are called ascenders.

Descenders are often reduced in small-print typefaces for uses such as newspapers, directories or pocket Bibles to fit more text on a page. More radically, on 20 May 1802 Philip Rusher of Banbury patented a new Patent Type with eliminated descenders and shortened ascenders. The type did not prove successful, nor did another use in 1852. The Art Nouveau display typeface Hobo and headline typeface Permanent Headline which also eliminates descenders have both been somewhat popular since.

Some early computer displays (for example, the Compukit UK101) and printers (for example, the Commodore 4022) restricted the vertical spacing of characters so that there was no space for correct display of descenders. Instead, characters with descenders were displaced vertically upwards so that the bottom of the descender was aligned with the baseline. Contemporary systems that did not have this restriction were described as supporting true descenders.

The descenders are parts of a character that lie below the baseline. For broader context, see Typeface anatomy.
