= Baseline (typography) =

Line in typography upon which most letters "sit" and below which descenders extend

The principal line terms in typography. For broader context, see Typeface anatomy.

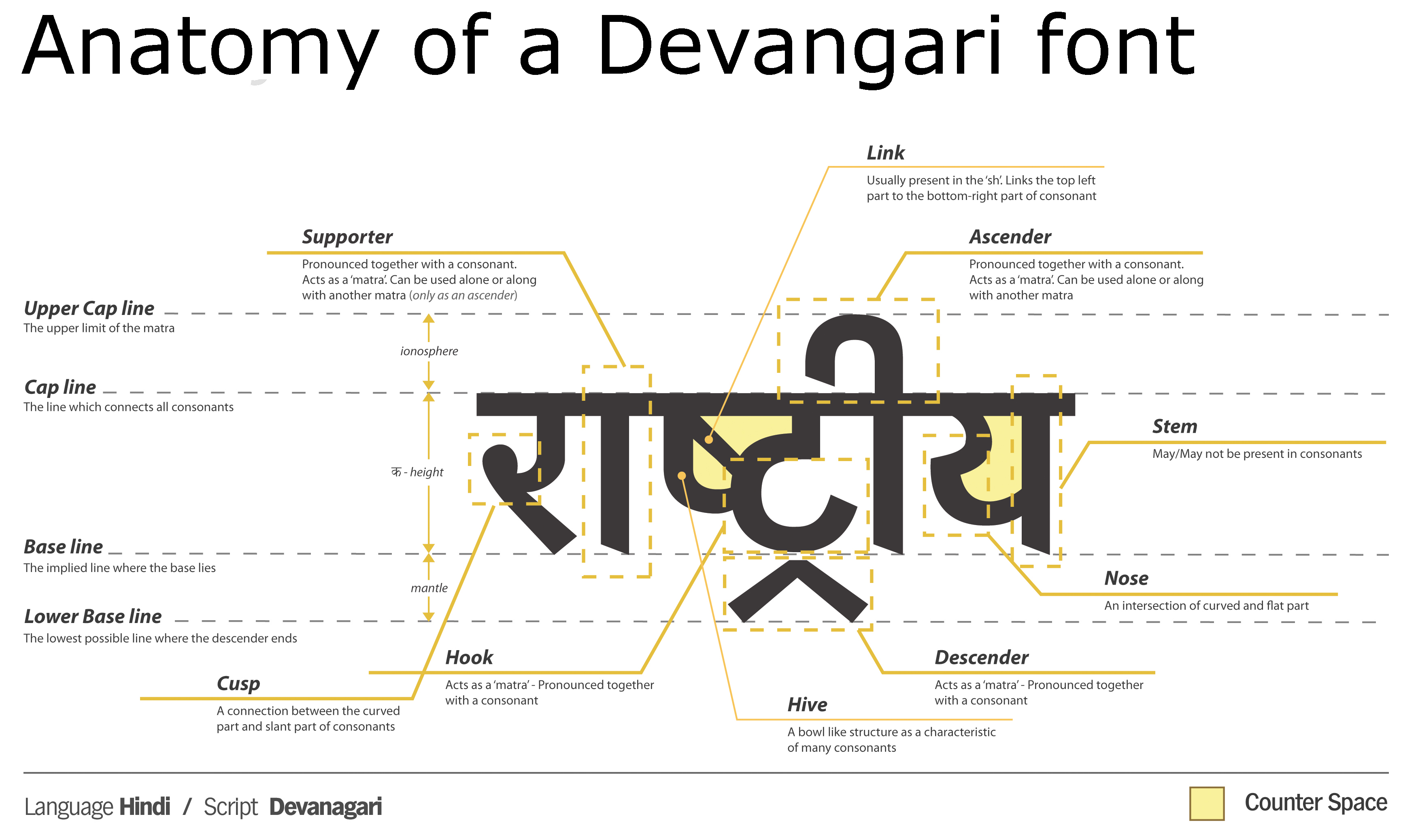
Anatomy of a Devanagari typeface

In European and West Asian typography and penmanship, the baseline is the line upon which most letters sit and below which descenders extend.

In the example to the right, the letter 'p' has a descender; the other letters sit on the (red) baseline.

Most, though not all, typefaces are similar in the following ways as regards the baseline:

- capital letters sit on the baseline. The most common exceptions are the J and Q.
- All lining figures sit on the baseline: 0, 1, 2, 3, 4, 5, 6, 7, 8, 9
- Some text figures have descenders: 3, 4, 5, 7 and 9
- The following lowercase letters have descenders: g j p q y.
- Glyphs with rounded lower and upper extents (0 3 6 8 c C G J o O Q) dip very slightly below the baseline ("overshoot") to create the optical illusion that they sit on the baseline, and rise above the x-height or capital height to create the illusion that they have the same height as flat glyphs (such as those for H x X 1 5 7). Peter Karow's Digital Typefaces suggests that typical overshoot is about 1.5%.

The vertical distance of the base lines of consecutive lines in a paragraph is also known as line height or leading, although the latter can also refer to the baseline distance minus the font size.

Northern Brahmic scripts have a characteristic hanging baseline; the letters are aligned to the top of the writing line, marked by an overbar, with diacritics extending above the baseline.

East Asian scripts have no baseline; each glyph sits in a square box, with neither ascenders nor descenders. When mixed with scripts with a low baseline, East Asian characters should be set so that the bottom of the character is between the baseline and the descender height.

== See also ==
- Overshoot – High and low points of some letters
