= Graphonomics =

Study of handwriting and drawing

Graphonomics is the interdisciplinary field directed towards the scientific analysis of the handwriting process, product, and other graphic skills.

Researchers in handwriting recognition, forensic handwriting examination, kinesiology, psychology, computer science, artificial intelligence, paleography and neuroscience cooperate in order to achieve a better understanding of the human skill of handwriting. Research in graphonomics generally involves handwriting movement analysis in one form or another.

== History and conferences ==
The first international conference relating to graphonomics was held in Nijmegen, The Netherlands, in July 1982. The term 'graphonomics' was used there for the first time.

The second conference was held in July 1985 in Hong Kong and, at that meeting, a decision was taken to form the International Graphonomics Society. The IGS became a legal non-profit organization under Netherlands law on January 30, 1987.

Subsequently, an international conference, symposium and/or workshop has been held every two years. Past events have been held in various locations with most events having a specific theme.

== IGS Publications ==
As the main academic body for graphonomics, the IGS publishes a biannual bulletin as well as proceedings of the biennial conference. The Bulletin of the International Graphonomics Society is published by the IGS in March and November each year and it is the primary means of communication among IGS members and the public. A complete list of past BIGS issues is available online. Conference proceedings are published in the form of a peer-reviewed scientific journal or book shortly after each of the conferences.

== Research topics ==
Some research topics in graphonomics include:

- Handwriting regeneration - the simulated production of a given recording of handwriting movement. This is realized not using recorded kinematic or kinetic signals but by an abstracted model of human movement control.
- Handwriting generation - the process of producing handwriting (e.g. pen tip) movements. This usually implies the use of a computer simulation model which can generate handwriting movement and/or shape, producing newly generated text in a manner similar to the handwriting of an individual person.
- Handwriting Production Fluency - Measures of the ability of handwriting in the integral of the absolute of the acceleration signal (velocity peaks), or alternatively the absolute of the integral of the jerk time function.

== See also ==
- Graphemics
- Writing systems
- Grammatology
- Letterform
- Terminology in graphonomics
