= Sentence spacing in language and style guides =

Sentence spacing guidance is provided in many language and style guides. The majority of style guides that use a Latin-derived alphabet as a language base now prescribe or recommend the use of a single space after the concluding punctuation of a sentence.

== Background ==
Historical style guides before the 20th century typically indicated that wider spaces were to be used between sentences. Standard word spaces were about one-third of an em space, but sentences were to be divided by a full em-space. With the arrival of the typewriter in the late 19th century, style guides for writers began diverging from printer's manuals, indicating that writers should double-space between sentences. This held for most of the 20th century until the computer began replacing the typewriter as the primary means of creating text. In the 1990s, style guides reverted to recommending a single-space between sentences. However, instead of a slightly larger sentence space, style guides simply indicated a standard word space. This is now the convention for publishers.

Style guides are important to writers since "virtually all professional editors work closely with one of them in editing a manuscript for publication". Comprehensive style guides, such as the Oxford Style Manual in the United Kingdom and style guides developed by the American Psychological Association, and the Modern Language Association in the United States, provide standards for a wide variety of writing, design, and English language topics—such as grammar, punctuation, and typographic conventions—and are widely used regardless of profession.

Many style guides do not provide guidance on sentence spacing. In some cases, the spacing of the volume or work itself provides an indication of the recommendation for usage of sentence spacing. A lack of guidance on sentence spacing is also notable for style guides in languages which did not adopt double sentence spacing to accommodate the mechanical limitations of the typewriter, and which conform to the current convention for published work, single sentence spacing. Most language guides for languages with prescriptive guidance provided by an academy also do not provide advice on sentence spacing.

== Language guides ==
Some languages have academies that set language rules. Their publications typically address orthography and grammar as opposed to matters of typography. Style guides are less relevant for these languages since their academies set prescriptive rules.

For example, the Académie française publishes the Dictionnaire de l'Académie française for French speakers worldwide. Although the 1992 edition does not provide guidance on sentence spacing, its text is single sentence spaced throughout—consistent with historical French spacing.

The German language manual Empfehlungen des Rats für deutsche Rechtschreibung, or "Recommendations of the Council for German Orthography" (2006), does not address sentence spacing. However, the manual itself uses one space after terminal punctuation. This is likely because the double-space convention was not prescribed in historical German language guides. Additionally, the Duden, the German-language dictionary most commonly used in Germany, indicates that double sentence spacing is an error.

The Spanish language is similar. The most important body within the Association of Spanish Language Academies, the Royal Spanish Academy, publishes the Diccionario de la lengua española, which is viewed as prescriptive for the Spanish language worldwide. The 1999 edition does not provide sentence spacing guidance, but is itself single sentence-spaced.

== International style guides ==
The European Union's Interinstitutional Style Guide indicates that single sentence spacing is to be used in all European Union publications, encompassing 23 languages.

For the English language, the European Commission's English Style Guide states that sentences are always single-spaced.

The Style manual for authors, editors and printers (6th edn, 2002), sponsored by the Australian Government, stipulates that only one space is used after "sentence-closing punctuation", and that "Programs for word processing and desktop publishing offer more sophisticated, variable spacing, so this practice of double spacing is now avoided because it can create distracting gaps on a page."

National languages not covered by an authoritative language academy typically have multiple style guides—which may not all discuss sentence spacing. This is the case in the United Kingdom. However, the Oxford Style Manual (2003) and the Modern Humanities Research Association's MHRA Style Guide (2002), state that only single spacing should be used. In Canada, both the English and French language sections of the Canadian Style, A Guide to Writing and Editing (1997), prescribe single sentence spacing. In the United States, many style guides—such as The Chicago Manual of Style (2003)—allow only single sentence spacing. A comprehensive style guide for general and academic use in Italy, Il Nuovo Manuale di Stile (2009), does not address sentence spacing, but the Guida di Stile Italiano (2010), the official guide for Microsoft translation, tells users to use single sentence spacing "instead of the double spacing used in the United States".

== U.S. government style guides ==
Since 1895, the United States Government Publishing Office (GPO) and its predecessors has been authorized by statute to "determine the form and style" of government publications. The 1959 edition of the United States Government Printing Office Style Manual prescribed an em space, equivalent to two word spaces, between sentences. The 1967 edition, however, states: "To conform with trade practice, a single justification space (close spacing) will be used between sentences." Subsequent editions of the government's style manual have continued to prescribe a single word space between sentences: "A single justified word space will be used between sentences (key one space when typing). This applies to all types of composition."

== General and academic style guides ==
The 2003 edition of the Oxford Style Manual combined the Oxford Guide to Style (first published as Hart's Rules in 1893) and the Oxford Dictionary for Writers and Editors ("defines the language of the entire English-speaking world, from North America to South Africa, from Australia and New Zealand to the Caribbean"). It states, "In text, use only a single word space after all sentence punctuation."

The Chicago Manual of Style is a comprehensive and widely used style manual for American English writing, and has been called the "standard of the book publishing industry". The 16th edition, published in 2010, states, "Like most publishers, Chicago advises leaving a single character space, not two spaces, between sentences ... and this recommendation applies to both the manuscript and the published work." Chicago provides further guidance as follows:

Punctuation and space—one space or two? In typeset matter, one space, not two should be used between two sentences—whether the first ends in a period, a question mark, an exclamation point, or a closing quotation mark or parenthesis.

The Turabian Style, published as the Manual for Writers of Research Papers, Theses, and Dissertations, is widely used in academic writing. The 7th Edition, published in 2007, stipulates that the use of periods, question marks, and exclamation points as "terminal punctuation" to end a sentence should be followed by a single space.

Until the early 2000s, the Modern Language Association (MLA) left room for its adherents to single or double sentence space. In 2008, it modified its position on sentence spacing to the following:

In an earlier era, writers using a typewriter commonly left two spaces after a period, a question mark, or an exclamation point. Publications in the United States today usually have the same spacing after concluding punctuation marks as between words on the same line. Since word processors make available the same fonts used by typesetters for printed works, many writers, influenced by the look of typeset publications, now leave only one space after a concluding punctuation mark. In addition, some publishers' guidelines for preparing a manuscript's electronic files ask professional authors to type only the spaces that are to appear in print. Because it is increasingly common for manuscripts to be prepared with a single space after all concluding punctuation marks, this spacing is recommended and shown in the examples in this manual.

== Scientific style guides ==
=== APA style ===
The Publication Manual of the American Psychological Association, also known as APA style, is a widely used style guide that is favored by the social sciences in the United States. Although 2009 saw a number of changes and reversals for certain aspects of its style recommendations, the current guidance from the American Psychological Association (APA) as of July 2009 is a recommendation to use two spaces for draft manuscripts and work. This recommendation does not apply "to the published, or final version, of a work", where the spacing convention is determined by the publication designer. Since U.S. publishers of print media typically use the single space convention, this means that drafts prepared with the double-space convention would be converted to the single space convention for final publication. The APA also notes, "the usual convention for published works remains one space after each period", and that the practice of publishers removing extra spaces from a manuscript prior to publication "is a routine part of the manuscript preparation process here at the APA".

=== Other scientific style guides ===
The 2006 edition of the Style Manual for Political Science, published by the American Political Science Association, states that "One space, not two, should follow all punctuation that ends a sentence." The 2nd edition of the American Sociological Association Style Guide, published by the American Sociological Association (ASA), provides guidance to use "only one space after all punctuation–periods and colons should not be followed by two spaces."

== Legal style guides ==
In the United States, there are a variety of legal writing style guides available. According to The Chicago Manual of Style, The Bluebook is the "most widely used [legal] citation guide" in the United States. The 2006 version of this guide to legal citations does not directly address spacing after the terminal punctuation of a sentence, although it does provide actual citation examples from court documents—some of which are single-spaced and some of which are double sentence spaced. A key statement in this guide, which addresses possible preferential differences between courts that require document submissions, notes that "Many state and federal courts promulgate local citation rules, which take precedence over Bluebook rules in documents submitted to those courts." Various other legal style guides provide non-committal positions on this topic, such as the 2006 version of the ALWD Citation Manual, which has been "widely adopted by law-school writing courses". This guide provides limited coverage on punctuation, referring readers to other style manuals that prescribe single sentence spacing. The Guide to Legal Writing Style (2007) also does not directly address this topic.

Some legal style guides do provide guidance on sentence spacing, such as the 2009 edition of the AP Stylebook and Briefing on Media Law, and the 2006 edition of The Redbook: A Manual on Legal Style—both of which state that a single space follows terminal punctuation. The Redbook provides further details on the use of this convention: "The custom during the reign of the typewriter was to insert two spaces between sentences" due to the use by typewriters of monospaced fonts that are not effective at creating readable text. It indicates that users could continue the use of two spaces if using a typewriter "or the Courier font", and espouses the advantages of widely available proportional fonts which are degraded by the use of two spaces after terminal punctuation. Of the legal style guides listed in this section, all use proportional fonts with a single space between sentences in their text.

== Professional style guides ==
A number of style guides exist to provide writing standards for various professions. For example, the 2009 edition of the Associated Press Stylebook calls for a single space following the terminal punctuation of a sentence. The Associated Press represents over 300 locations worldwide. For copyeditors, the 2nd edition of the Copyeditor's Handbook: A Guide for Book Publishing and Corporate Communications, published in 2006, states that users should "delete any extra word spacing before or after punctuation marks" and that "The conventions are: One space follows a sentence-ending punctuation mark."

Multiple style guides exist within the United States health care industry. The 10th Edition (2007) of the AMA Manual of Style is a comprehensive work which includes a separate section on typography. Although the manual does not provide specific guidance regarding sentence spacing, it provides examples of single-spaced journal pages used for American Medical Association (AMA) publications to show standard AMA elements of design. The 2007 edition (10th Ed.of the Health Professional's Style Manual also does not directly address this topic—referring users to specific style manuals such as The Chicago Manual of Style, the APA style manual, and the Elements of Style.

The Gregg Reference Manual is a style manual intended for business professionals. The 1985 edition simply indicated that two spaces were to be used following terminal punctuation. The most recent edition, published in 2005, provides detailed guidance for sentence spacing. Its general guidance indicates that, "The standard for proportional fonts has always been the same: use only one space between the period and the start of the next sentence" and "now that the standards of desktop publishing predominate, the use of only one space after the period is quite acceptable with monospace fonts." However, although the author states that one space is correct in draft manuscripts for typesetting and most other instances, certain specific cases might benefit from additional space between sentences. For example, "As a general rule, use one space at the end of a sentence, but switch to two spaces whenever you feel a stronger visual break between sentences is needed." The manual identifies specific instances when only one space is to be used between sentences such as "If you are preparing manuscript on a computer and the file will be used for typesetting, use only one space and ignore the issue of visual appearance." The manual indicates that writers should also "Use only one space if the text will have justified margins," and "If the manuscript has already been typed with two spaces at the end of every sentence, use the Replace function to change two spaces to one space throughout." The author adds the caveat that in certain instances a writer may want to use two spaces between sentences. The examples given are: when one space "may not provide a clear visual break between sentences", if an abbreviation is used at the end of a sentence, or when some very small proportional fonts (such as 10-point Times New Roman) are used. The manual clearly places an emphasis on the use of white space to create a pleasing document by noting spacing rules that differ from current norms such as the use of two spaces before opening a parenthesis, after closing quotation marks, and after opening single quotation marks inside of sentences.

There are a variety of guides used by screenwriters. Most works identify the Courier 12-point font as the industry "standard" for manuscripts, such as the Screenwriter's Bible: A Complete Guide to Writing, Formatting, and Selling Your Script. Some works on screenwriting—such as Screenplay: Writing the Picture—indicate that proportional fonts may be used though Courier is preferred.

Moira Anderson Allen suggests that publishers are more interested in readable fonts as opposed to maintaining a monospaced font standard. All of these works illustrate single sentence spacing in their manuscript examples, regardless of font type.

== Other style guides ==
There are various works that provide design guidance for websites. The 2008 edition of the Web Style Guide does not discuss spacing after the terminal punctuation of a sentence, although it provides a chapter on typography. In this section, the authors assert "the basic rules of typography are much the same for both web pages and conventional print documents." Although the guide does not specifically recommend against the use of monospaced fonts, only proportional fonts are presented as "common screen fonts" and those "designed for the screen". Finally, although HTML ignores additional spacing after the terminal punctuation of a sentence, the authors caution against custom fonts and typefaces because most users' browsers will default to a font defined by their operating system.

A number of style guides do not provide guidance on this convention, especially those that are smaller in scope and rely on other, more comprehensive style guides to provide a framework. However, some of these style guides are well-known, including the 4th edition of Strunk and White's The Elements of Style, a widely used general style guide, which is silent in reference to typography and spacing between sentences. Other U.S. style guides that do not address sentence spacing include, Scientific Style And Format: The CSE Manual for Authors, Editors, And Publishers, the AMA Manual of Style, the Wall Street Journal Essential Guide to Business Style and Usage (2002), the New York Times Manual of Style and Usage, REA's Handbook of English Grammar, Style, and Writing (2009), and the American Sociological Society Style Guide (2007). In the United Kingdom, the Economist Style Guide (2005), Guardian Style Guide, and the Times Style Guide also provide no guidance on this topic. All of these guides themselves use single sentence spacing in their text.

== See also ==
- History of sentence spacing
- List of style guides
- Sentence spacing
- Sentence spacing in digital media
- Orphans and widows
- Style guides
- History of Western typography
- History of typography in East Asia
