= FPO =

FPO may refer to:

- ASL Airlines France (ICAO code)
- Fareynikte Partizaner Organizatsye, a World War II resistance organization in the Vilna Ghetto
- Field Post Office
- Fleet Post Office
- Florida Philharmonic Orchestra, in Fort Lauderdale, Florida, US
- Follow-on public offer
- For position only
- FPO mark, a fruit product certification, India
- Freedom Party of Austria (German: Freiheitliche Partei Österreichs, FPÖ), a political party
- Freedom Party of Ontario, a far-right political party in Canada
- Grand Bahama International Airport
- Franciscans of Primitive Observance
