= History of typography =

The history of typography may refer to:

- History of Western typography, for the history of typography in Europe and the wider Western world
- History of typography in East Asia, for the history of East Asian typography and printing
