= Full stop =

Punctuation to signal the end of a sentence (.)

.o

Full stop
- Other names: Period / full point
- U+002E . FULL STOP (&period;)

The full stop (Commonwealth English), period (North American English), or full point (.), is a punctuation mark used for several purposes, most often to mark the end of a declarative sentence (as distinguished from a question or exclamation). (Note: This sentence-ending use, alone, defines the strictest sense of full stop. Although full stop technically applies only when the mark is used to end a sentence, the distinction—drawn since at least 1897—is not maintained by all modern style guides and dictionaries.)

A full stop is frequently used at the end of word abbreviations—in British usage, primarily truncations such as Rev., but not after contractions which retain the final letter such as Revd; (Note: Fowler's Modern English Usage is prescriptive: abbreviations formed by dropping the end of a word are properly given a period, but doing the same to those where some portion of the middle is dropped, "is ill advised".) in American English, it is used in both cases. It may be placed after an initial letter used to abbreviate a word. It is often placed after each individual letter in initialisms, (e.g., U.S.), but not usually in those that are acronyms (NATO). However, the use of full stops after letters in initialisms is declining, and many of these without punctuation have become accepted norms (e.g., UK and NATO). (Note: This trend has progressed somewhat more slowly in the English dialect of the United States than in other English language dialects.) When used in a series (typically of three, an ellipsis) the mark is also used to indicate omitted words.

In the English-speaking world, a punctuation mark identical to the full stop is used as the decimal separator and for other purposes, and may be called a point. In computing, it is called a dot. It is sometimes called a baseline dot to distinguish it from the interpunct (or middle dot).

== History ==
=== Ancient Greek origin ===
The full stop symbol derives from the Greek punctuation introduced by Aristophanes of Byzantium in the 3rd century BCE in Alexandria. In his system, there was a series of dots whose placement determined their meaning. His three punctuations were these: the end of a completed thought or expression was marked by a high dot ˙, called the stigmḕ teleía (στιγμὴ τελεία) or "terminal dot"; the "middle dot" ·, the stigmḕ mésē (στιγμὴ μέση), marked a division in a thought occasioning a longer breath (essentially a semicolon); the low dot ., called the hypostigmḕ (ὑποστιγμή) or "underdot", marked a division in a thought occasioning a shorter breath (essentially a comma).

The name period is first attested (as the Latin loanword peridos) in Ælfric of Eynsham's Old English treatment on grammar. There, it was distinguished from the full stop (the distinctio) and continued the Greek underdot's earlier function as a comma between phrases. It shifted its meaning to a dot marking a full stop in the works of the 16th-century grammarians. In the 7th century, Isidore of Seville updated the system slightly; he assigned the dots to indicate short ., medium · and long · pauses in reading, respectively.

=== Medieval Latin to modern English ===
In practice, scribes mostly employed the terminal dot; the others fell out of use and were later replaced by other symbols. From the 9th century onwards, the full stop began appearing as a low mark (instead of a high one), and by the time printing began in Western Europe, the lower dot was regular and then universal.

In 19th-century texts, British English and American English both frequently used the terms period and full stop. The word period was used as a name for what printers often called the "full point", the punctuation mark that was a dot on the baseline and used in several situations. The phrase full stop was only used to refer to the punctuation mark when it was used to terminate a sentence. This terminological distinction seems to be eroding. For example, the 1998 edition of Fowler's Modern English Usage used full point for the mark used after an abbreviation, but full stop or full point when it was employed at the end of a sentence; the 2015 edition, however, treats them as synonymous (and prefers full stop), and New Hart's Rules does likewise (but prefers full point). The last edition (1989) of the original Hart's Rules (before it became The Oxford Guide to Style in 2002) exclusively used full point.

== Usage ==
Full stops are the most commonly used punctuation marks; analysis of texts indicate that approximately half of all punctuation marks used are full stops. Some of the usages of full stops are:

=== Ending sentences ===
Full stops indicate the end of declarative sentences, in contrast to questions or exclamations. The full stop is omitted when adjacent to an ellipsis.

=== Abbreviations ===
It is usual in North American English to use full stops after initials; e.g.: A. A. Milne and George W. Bush. British usage is less strict. A few style guides discourage full stops after initials. However, there is a general trend and initiatives to spell out names in full instead of abbreviating them in order to avoid ambiguity.

A full stop is used after some abbreviations. If the abbreviation ends a declaratory sentence, there is no additional period immediately following the full stop that ends the abbreviation (e.g. "My name is Gabriel Gama Jr."). Though two full stops (one for the abbreviation, one for the sentence ending) might be expected, conventionally only one is written. This is an intentional omission, and thus not haplography, which is an unintentional omission of a duplicate. In the case of an interrogative or exclamatory sentence ending with an abbreviation, a question or exclamation mark can still be added (e.g., "Are you Gabriel Gama Jr.?").

According to the Oxford Dictionaries, this does not include, for example, the standard abbreviations for titles such as Professor ("Prof.") or Reverend ("Rev."), because they do not end with the last letter of the word they are abbreviating. In American English, the common convention is to include the period after all such abbreviations.

==== Acronyms and initialisms ====
In acronyms and initialisms, the modern style is generally to not use full points after each initial (e.g.: DNA, UK, USSR). The punctuation is somewhat more often used in American English, most commonly with U.S. and U.S.A. in particular, depending upon the house style of a particular writer or publisher. As some examples from American style guides, The Chicago Manual of Style (primarily for book and academic-journal publishing) deprecates the use of full points in initialisms, including U.S., while The Associated Press Stylebook (primarily for journalism) dispenses with full points in initialisms, including acronyms, except for certain two-letter cases, including U.S., U.K. and U.N., but not EU. Acronyms, which can be pronounced as words, have tended to lose full stops even when they were formerly used; e.g., Queensland and Northern Territory Aerial Services became Q.A.N.T.A.S., then QANTAS, and ultimately Qantas.

=== Time ===
In British English, whether for the 12-hour clock or sometimes its 24-hour counterpart, the dot is commonly used and some style guides recommend it when telling time, including those from non-BBC public broadcasters in the UK, the academic manual published by Oxford University Press under various titles, as well as the internal house style book for the University of Oxford, and that of The Economist, The Guardian and The Times newspapers. American and Canadian English mostly prefers and uses colons (:) (i.e., 11:15 PM/pm/p.m. or 23:15 for AmE/CanE and 11.15 pm or 23.15 for BrE); the UK BBC uses only 24-hour times with a colon, since at least the August 2020 update of its news style guide. The point as a time separator is also used in Irish English, particularly by the Raidió Teilifís Éireann (RTÉ), and to a lesser extent in Australian, Cypriot, Maltese, New Zealand, South African and other Commonwealth English varieties outside Canada.

=== In conversation ===
In British English, the words "full stop" at the end of an utterance strengthen it; they indicate that it admits no further discussion: "I'm not going with you, full stop." In American English, the word "period" serves this function. Another common use in African-American Vernacular English is found in the phrase "And that's on period", which is used to express the strength of the speaker's previous statement, usually to emphasise an opinion.

=== Decimal or thousands separator ===
The period glyph is used in the presentation of numbers, either as a decimal separator or as a thousands separator.

In the more prevalent usage in English-speaking countries, as well as in South Asia and East Asia, the point represents a decimal separator, visually dividing whole numbers from fractional (decimal) parts. The comma is then used to separate the whole-number parts into groups of three digits each when numbers are sufficiently large.

- 1.007 (one and seven thousandths)
- 1,002.007 (one thousand two and seven thousandths)
- 1,002,003.007 (one million two thousand three and seven thousandths)

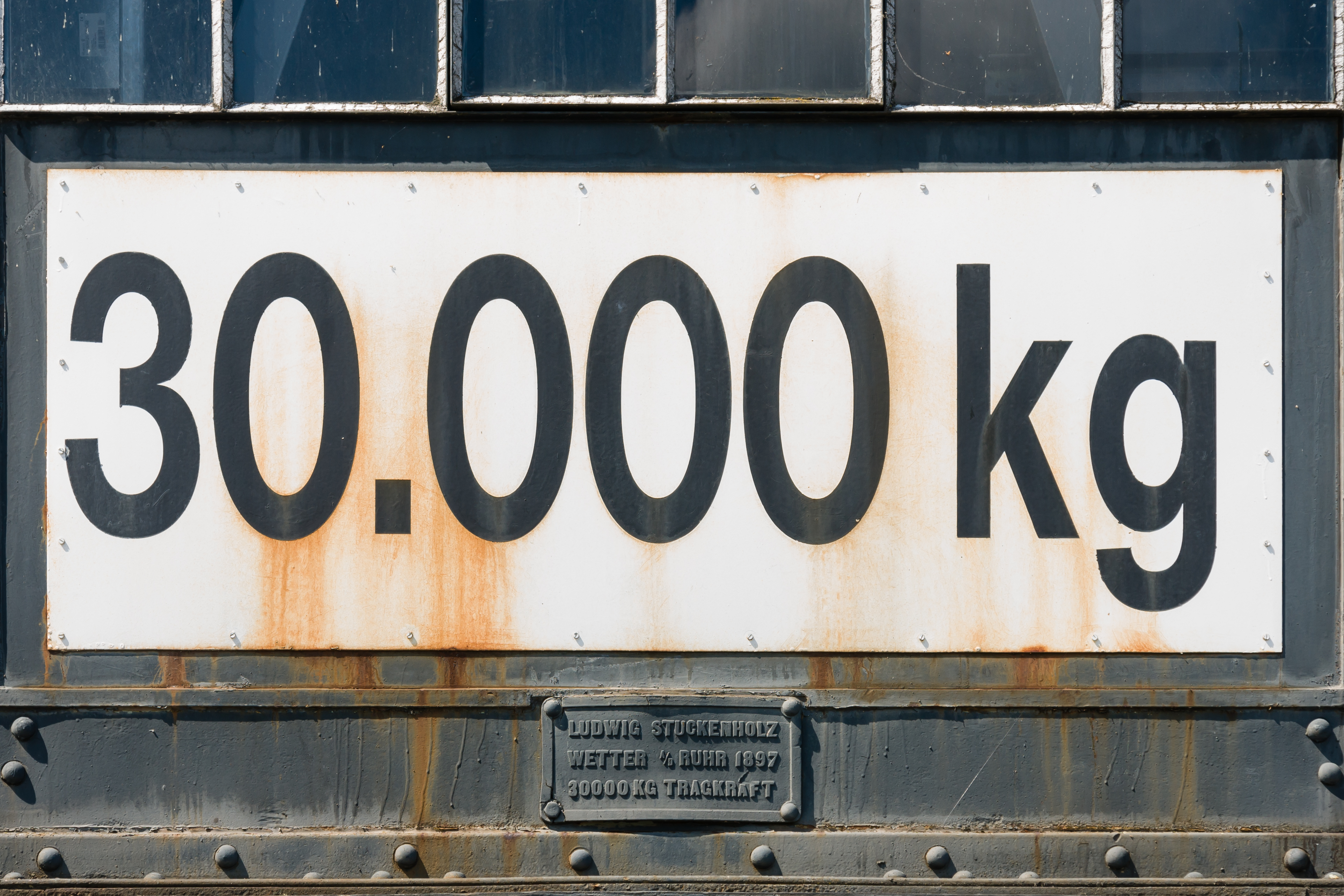
A point used as a thousands separator on a sign in Germany

The more prevalent usage in much of Europe, southern Africa and Latin America (with the exception of Mexico due to the influence of the United States) reverses the roles of the comma and point but sometimes substitutes a (thin-)space for a point.

- 1,007 (one and seven thousandths)
- 1.002,007 or 1 002,007 (one thousand two and seven thousandths)
- 1.002.003,007 or 1 002 003,007 (one million two thousand three and seven thousandths)

To avoid problems with the spaces (such as the potential confusion that could be introduced by line wrapping), another convention sometimes used is to use apostrophe signs (') instead of spaces.

India, Bangladesh, Nepal and Pakistan follow the Indian numbering system, which utilizes commas and decimals much like the aforementioned system popular in most English-speaking countries but separates values of one hundred thousand and above differently, into divisions of lakh and crore:

- 1.007 (one and seven thousandths)
- 1,002.007 (one thousand two and seven thousandths)
- 10,02,003.007 (one million two thousand three and seven thousandths, or ten lakh two thousand three and seven thousandths)

=== Multiplication sign ===
In countries that use the comma as a decimal separator, the point is sometimes found as a multiplication sign; for example, 5,2 . 2 = 10,4; this usage is impractical in cases where the point is used as a decimal separator, hence the use of the interpunct: 5.2 · 2 = 10.4. The interpunct is also used when multiplying units in science—for example, 50 km/h could be written as 50 km·h^{−1}—and to indicate a dot product, i.e., the scalar product of two vectors.

=== Ordinal dot ===
In many languages, an ordinal dot is used as the ordinal indicator. This applies mostly in Central and Northern Europe: in German, Hungarian, several Slavic languages (Czech, Slovak, Slovene, Serbo-Croatian), Faroese, Icelandic, Danish, Norwegian, Finnish, Estonian, Latvian and also in Basque and Turkish. The dots are typically placed after the ordinal number; for example, "7." generally represents the seventh.

The Serbian standard of Serbo-Croatian (unlike the Croatian and Bosnian standards) uses the dot in the role of the ordinal indicator only past Arabic numerals, while Roman numerals are used without a dot. In Polish, the period can be omitted if there is no ambiguity about whether a given numeral is ordinal or cardinal.

=== Multilevel numbered headings ===
In modern texts, multilevel numbered headings are widely used. For example, the string "2.3.1.5" represents a 4th-level heading within chapter 2 (i.e., in the second chapter, the third subsection, the first sub-subsection, and the fifth sub-sub-subsection).

=== Logic ===
In older literature on mathematical logic, the period glyph was used to indicate how expressions should be bracketed, as explained in the Glossary of Principia Mathematica. Full stops can be used as the border of logical operations to potentially prevent ambiguities; e.g., in ⊢: P∈Ω. E!B̌P. ⊃. P∈Ded., full stops are used to separate logical statements.

=== Computing ===
In computing, the full point, usually called a dot in this context, is often used as a delimiter, such as in DNS lookups, Web addresses, file names and software release versions:

- www.wikipedia.org
- document.txt
- 192.168.0.1
- Chrome 92.0.4515.130

It is used in many programming languages as an important part of the syntax. C uses it as a means of accessing a member of a struct, and this syntax was inherited by C++ as a means of accessing a member of a class or object. Java and Python also follow this convention. Pascal uses it both as a means of accessing a member of a record set (the equivalent of struct in C), a member of an object, and after the end construct that defines the body of the program. In APL, it is also used for generalised inner product and outer product. In Erlang, Prolog and Smalltalk, it marks the end of a statement ("sentence"). In a regular expression, it represents a match of any character. In Perl and PHP, the dot is the string concatenation operator. In the Haskell standard library, it is the function composition operator. In COBOL, a full stop ends a statement.

In file systems, the dot is commonly used to separate the extension of a file name from the name of the file (e.g., filename.mp4). RISC OS uses dots to separate levels of the hierarchical file system when writing path names—similar to / (forward-slash) in Unix-based systems and \ (back-slash) in MS-DOS-based systems and the Windows NT systems that succeeded them. In Unix-like operating systems, some applications treat files or directories that start with a dot as hidden. This means that they are not displayed or listed to the user by default. In Unix-like systems and Microsoft Windows, the dot character represents the working directory of the file system. Two dots (..) represent the parent directory of the working directory.

Bourne shell-derived command-line interpreters, such as sh, ksh and bash, use the dot as a command to read a file and execute its content in the running interpreter. (Some of these also offer source as a synonym, based on that usage in the C shell.)

Versions of software are often denoted with the style x.y.z (or more), where x is a major release, y is a mid-cycle enhancement release and z is a patch level designation, but actual usage is entirely vendor specific.

=== Telegraphy ===
The term STOP was used in telegrams in the United States in place of the full stop. The end of a sentence would be marked by STOP; its use "in telegraphic communications was greatly increased during the World War, when the Government employed it widely as a precaution against having messages garbled or misunderstood, as a result of the misplacement or emission [sic] of the tiny dot or period."

=== Phonetic alphabet ===
The International Phonetic Alphabet uses the full stop to signify a syllable break.

== Punctuation styles when quoting ==
The practice in the United States and Canada is to place full stops and commas inside quotation marks in most styles. In the British system, which is also called "logical quotation", full stops and commas are placed according to grammatical sense: This means that when they are part of the quoted material, they should be placed inside, and otherwise should be outside. For example, they are placed outside in the cases of words-as-words, titles of short-form works and quoted sentence fragments.

- Bruce Springsteen, nicknamed "the Boss," performed "American Skin." (closed or American style)
- Bruce Springsteen, nicknamed "the Boss", performed "American Skin". (logical or British style)
- He said, "I love music." (both)

There is some national crossover. The American style is common in British fiction writing. The British style is sometimes used in American English. For example, The Chicago Manual of Style recommends it for fields where comma placement could affect the meaning of the quoted material, such as linguistics and textual criticism.

The use of placement according to logical or grammatical sense, or "logical convention", now the more common practice in regions other than North America, was advocated in the influential book The King's English by Fowler and Fowler, published in 1906. Prior to the influence of this work, the typesetter's or printer's style, or "closed convention", now also called American style, was common throughout the world.

== Spacing after a full stop ==
There have been a number of practices relating to the spacing after a full stop. Some examples are listed below:

- One word space ("French spacing"). This is the current convention in most countries that use the ISO basic Latin alphabet for published and final written work, as well as digital media.
- Two word spaces ("English spacing"). It is sometimes claimed that the two-space convention stems from the use of the monospaced font on typewriters, but in fact that convention replicates much earlier typography—the intent was to provide a clear break between sentences. This spacing method was gradually replaced by the single space convention in published print, where space is at a premium, and continues in much digital media.
- One widened space (such as an em space). This spacing was seen in historical typesetting practices (until the early 20th century). It has also been used in other typesetting systems such as the Linotype machine and the TeX system. Modern computer-based digital fonts can adjust the spacing after terminal punctuation as well, creating a space slightly wider than a standard word space.

== In other scripts ==
=== Greek ===
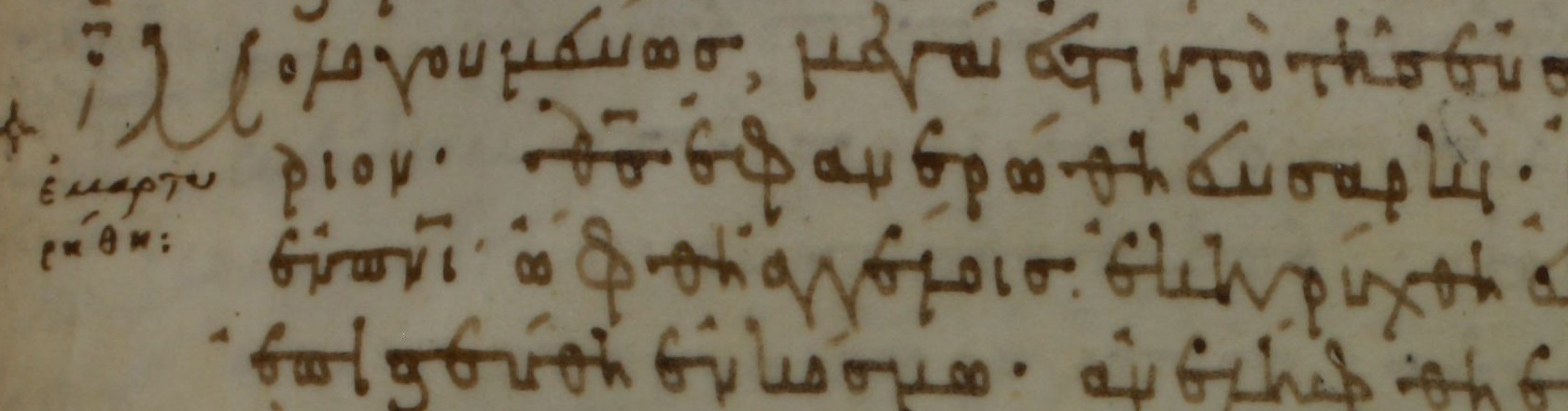
A New Testament manuscript with high dots as full stops

Although the present Greek full stop (τελεία, teleía) is romanized as a Latin full stop and encoded identically with the full stop in Unicode, the historic full stop in Greek was a high dot and the low dot functioned as a kind of comma, as noted above. The low dot was increasingly but irregularly used to mark full stops after the 9th century and was fully adapted after the advent of print. The teleia should also be distinguished from the ano teleia, which is named "high stop" but looks like an interpunct, and principally functions as the Greek semicolon.

=== Armenian ===
The Armenian script uses the ։ (վերջակետ, verdjaket). It looks similar to the colon (:).

=== Chinese and Japanese ===
Punctuation used with Chinese characters (and in Japanese) often includes U+3002 。 IDEOGRAPHIC FULL STOP, a small circle used as a full stop instead of a solid dot. When used with traditional characters, the full stop is generally centered on the mean line; when used with simplified characters, it is usually aligned to the baseline. In written vertical text, the full stop is sometimes positioned to the top-right or in the top- to center-middle. In Unicode, it is the U+FE12 ︒ PRESENTATION FORM FOR VERTICAL IDEOGRAPHIC FULL STOP.

=== Korean ===
Korean uses the Latin full stop along with its native script.

=== Ge'ez ===
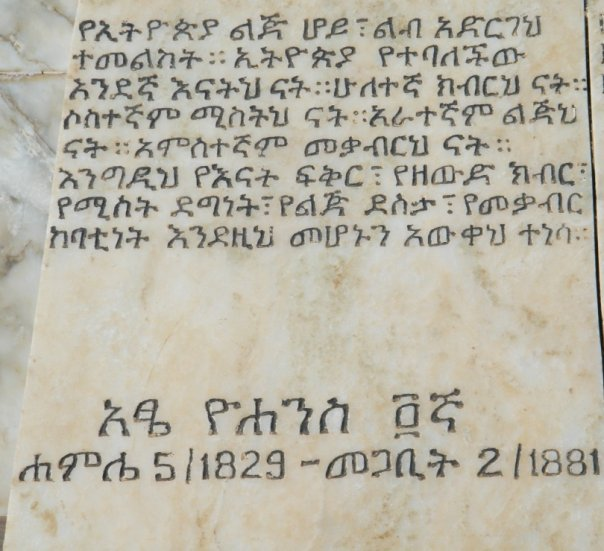
An ˈarat nettib written in an Amharic inscription that commemorated Yohannes IV's call to arms

In the Ge'ez script that is used to write Amharic and several other Ethiopian and Eritrean languages, the equivalent of the full stop following a sentence is the "ˈarat nettib" (U+1362 ። ETHIOPIC FULL STOP), which means four dots. The two dots on the right are slightly ascending from the two on the left, with space in between.

=== Brahmic scripts ===
==== Nagari ====
Indo-Aryan languages predominantly use Nagari-based scripts. In the Devanagari script that is used to write languages like Hindi, Maithili, Nepali, etc., a vertical line U+0964 । DEVANAGARI DANDA is used to mark the end of a sentence. It is known as poorna viraam (full stop). In Sanskrit, the additional symbol of two vertical lines U+0965 ॥ DEVANAGARI DOUBLE DANDA is used to mark the end of a poetic verse. However, some languages that are written in Devanagari use the Latin full stop, such as Marathi.

In the Eastern Nagari script used to write languages like Bangla and Assamese, the same vertical line ("।") is used for a full stop, known as Daa`ri in Bengali. Also, languages like Odia and Panjabi (which respectively use Oriya and Gurmukhi scripts) use the same symbol. Inspired from Indic scripts, the Santali language also uses a similar symbol in Ol Chiki script: U+1C7E ᱾ OL CHIKI PUNCTUATION MUCAAD to mark the end of a sentence. Similarly, it also uses U+1C7F ᱿ OL CHIKI PUNCTUATION DOUBLE MUCAAD to indicate a major break, like the end of a section, although rarely used.

==== Sinhalese ====
In Sinhala, a symbol called kundaliya U+0DF4 ෴ SINHALA PUNCTUATION KUNDDALIYA was used before the colonial era. Latin full stops were later introduced into the Sinhalese script after the introduction of paper due to the influence of European languages.

==== Southeast Asian ====
In Burmese script, the symbol U+104B ။ MYANMAR SIGN SECTION is used as a full stop. However, in Thai, no symbol corresponding to the full stop is used as terminal punctuation. A sentence is written without spaces and a space is typically used to mark the end of a clause or sentence.

==== Tibetic ====
The Tibetan script uses two different full stops: tshig-grub (U+0F0D ། TIBETAN MARK SHAD) marks the end of a section of text, while the don-tshan (U+0F0E ༎ TIBETAN MARK NYIS SHAD) is used to mark the end of a whole topic. The descendants of Tibetic script also use similar symbols: For example, the Róng script of the Lepcha language uses ᰻ and ᰼ (U+1C3B ᰻ LEPCHA PUNCTUATION TA-ROL and U+1C3C ᰼ LEPCHA PUNCTUATION NYET THYOOM TA-ROL). However, due to the influence of the Burmese script, the Meitei script of the Manipuri language uses U+AAF0 ꫰ MEETEI MAYEK CHEIKHAN for a comma and U+ABEB ꯫ MEETEI MAYEK CHEIKHEI to mark the end of a sentence.

=== Shahmukhi ===
For Indo-Aryan languages which are written in Nastaliq, like Kashmiri, Panjabi, Saraiki and Urdu, a symbol called k͟hatma (U+06D4 ۔ ARABIC FULL STOP) is used as a full stop at the end of sentences and in abbreviations. The symbol (۔) looks similar to a lowered dash (–).

== Unicode ==
Full stop Unicode code points:

- U+002E . FULL STOP
- U+0589 ։ ARMENIAN FULL STOP
- U+06D4 ۔ ARABIC FULL STOP
- U+0701 ܁ SYRIAC SUPRALINEAR FULL STOP
- U+0702 ܂ SYRIAC SUBLINEAR FULL STOP
- U+1362 ። ETHIOPIC FULL STOP
- U+166E ᙮ CANADIAN SYLLABICS FULL STOP
- U+1803 ᠃ MONGOLIAN FULL STOP
- U+1809 ᠉ MONGOLIAN MANCHU FULL STOP
- U+2CF9 ⳹ COPTIC OLD NUBIAN FULL STOP
- U+2CFE ⳾ COPTIC FULL STOP
- U+2E3C ⸼ STENOGRAPHIC FULL STOP
- U+3002 。 IDEOGRAPHIC FULL STOP
- U+A4FF ꓿ LISU PUNCTUATION FULL STOP
- U+A60E ꘎ VAI FULL STOP
- U+A6F3 ꛳ BAMUM FULL STOP
- U+FE12 ︒ PRESENTATION FORM FOR VERTICAL IDEOGRAPHIC FULL STOP
- U+FE52 ﹒ SMALL FULL STOP
- U+FF0E ． FULLWIDTH FULL STOP
- U+FF61 ｡ HALFWIDTH IDEOGRAPHIC FULL STOP
- U+16AF5 𖫵 BASSA VAH FULL STOP
- U+16E98 𖺘 MEDEFAIDRIN FULL STOP
- U+1BC9F 𛲟 DUPLOYAN PUNCTUATION CHINOOK FULL STOP
- U+1DA88 𝪈 SIGNWRITING FULL STOP
- U+E002E TAG FULL STOP

== In text messages ==
Researchers from Binghamton University performed a small study, published in 2016, on young adults and found that text messages that included sentences ended with full stops—as opposed to those with no terminal punctuation—were perceived as insincere, though they stipulated that their results apply only to this particular medium of communication: "Our sense was, is that because [text messages] were informal and had a chatty kind of feeling to them, that a period may have seemed stuffy, too formal, in that context," said head researcher Cecelia Klin. The study did not find handwritten notes to be affected.

A 2016 story by Jeff Guo in The Washington Post stated that the line break had become the default method of punctuation in texting, comparable to the use of line breaks in poetry, and that a period at the end of a sentence causes the tone of the message to be perceived as cold, angry or passive-aggressive.

According to Gretchen McCulloch, an internet linguist, using a full stop to end messages is seen as "rude" by more and more people. She said this can be attributed to the way we text and use instant messaging apps like WhatsApp and Facebook Messenger. She added that the default way to break up one's thoughts is to send each thought as an individual message.

== See also ==
- Decimal separator – Numerical symbol
- Dot (disambiguation)
- Sentence spacing – Horizontal space between sentences in typeset text
- Terminal punctuation – Marks that identify the end of some text
