= History of sentence spacing =

Evolution of sentence spacing conventions from the introduction of movable type in Europe

The history of sentence spacing is the evolution of sentence spacing conventions from the introduction of movable type in Europe by Johannes Gutenberg to the present day.

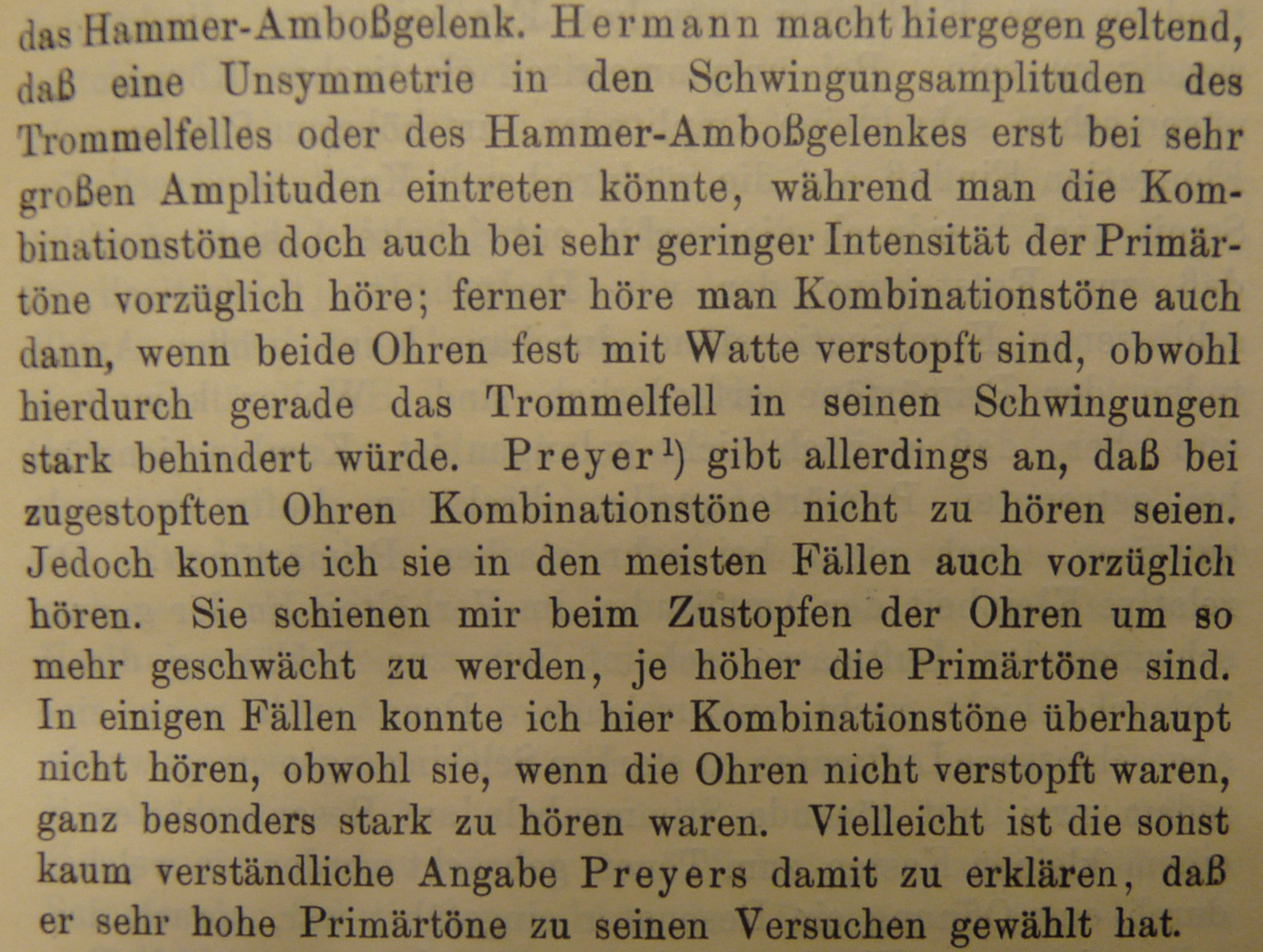
An example of early sentence spacing with an em-quad between sentences (1909)

Typesetting in all European languages enjoys a long tradition of using spaces of varying widths for the express purpose of enhancing readability. American, English, French, and other European typesetters' style guides — also known as printers' rules — specified spacing rules which were all essentially identical from the 18th century onwards. Early English language guides by Jacobi in the UK and MacKellar, Harpel, Bishop, and De Vinne in the US specified that sentences would be separated by more space than that of a normal word space. Spaces between sentences were to be em-spaced, and words would normally be 1/3 em-spaced, or occasionally 1/2 em-spaced (see the illustration to the right). This remained standard for quite some time.

MacKellar's The American Printer was the dominant language style guide in the US at the time and ran to at least 17 editions between 1866 and 1893. De Vinne's The Practice of Typography was the undisputed global authority on English-language typesetting style from 1901 until well past Dowding's first formal alternative spacing suggestion in the mid-1950s. Both the American and the UK style guides also specified that spaces should be inserted between punctuation and text. The MacKellar guide described these as hair spaces but itself used a much wider space than was then commonly regarded as a hair space. Spaces following words or punctuation were subject to line breaks, and spaces between words and closely associated punctuation were non-breaking. Additionally, spaces were (and still are today) varied proportionally in width when justifying lines, originally by hand, later by machine, now usually by software.

The spacing differences between traditional typesetting and modern conventional printing standards are easily observed by comparing two different versions of the same book, from the Mabinogion:

1. 1894: the Badger-in-the-bag game—traditional typesetting spacing rules: a single enlarged em-space between sentences
2. 1999: the Badger-in-the-bag game—modern mass-production commercial printing: a single word space between sentences

The 1999 example demonstrates the current convention for published work. The 1894 version demonstrates thin-spaced words but em-spaced sentences. It also demonstrates spaces around punctuation according to the rules above and equivalent to French typesetting today.

== French and English spacing ==
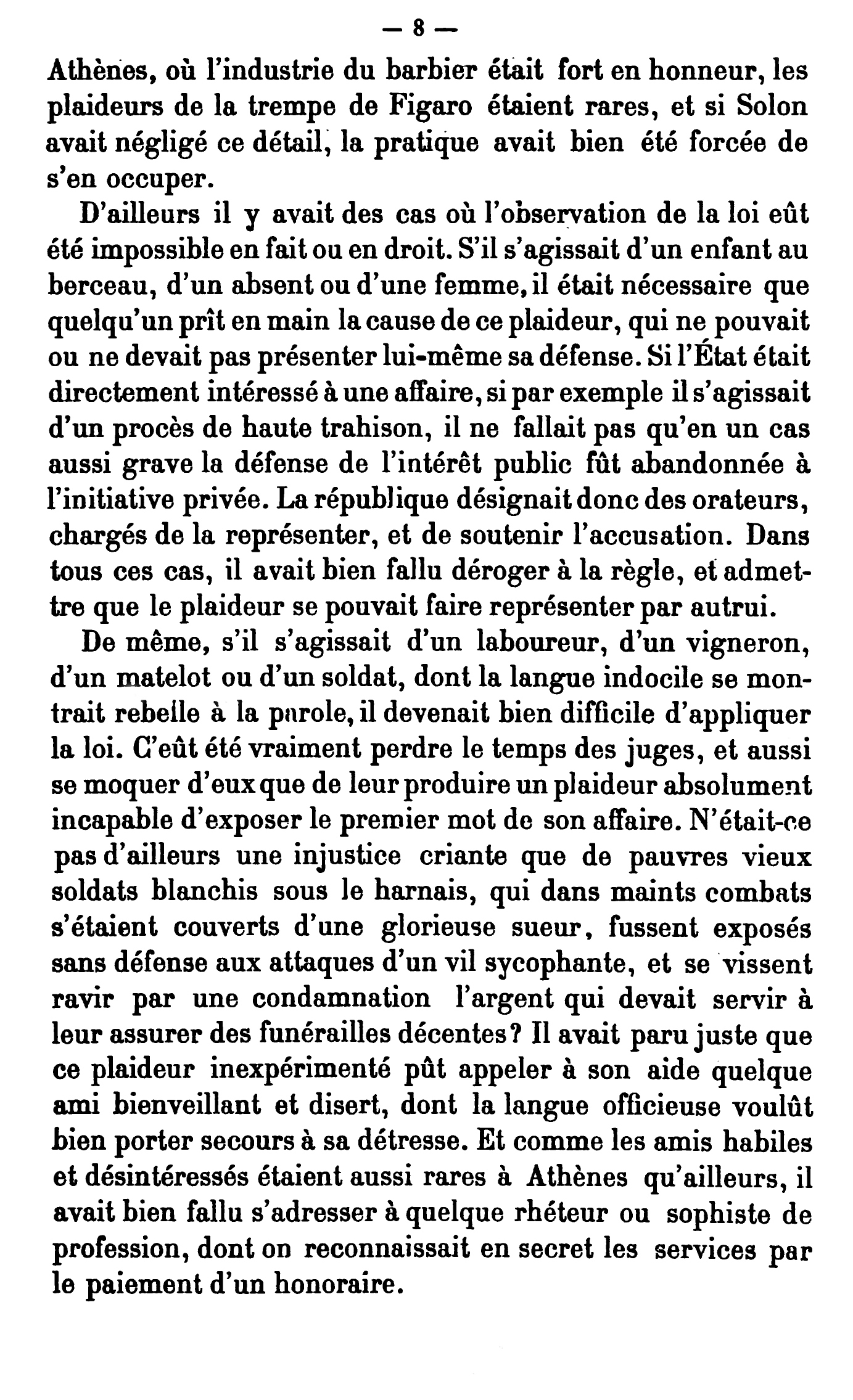
French-spaced typeset text (1874)

With the advent of the typewriter in the late nineteenth century, typists adopted approximations of standard spacing practices to fit the limitations of the typewriter itself. French typists used a single space between sentences, consistent with the typeset French spacing technique, whereas English typists used a double space.

- French spacing inserted spaces around most punctuation marks, but single-spaced after sentences, colons, and semicolons.
- English spacing removed spaces around most punctuation marks, but double-spaced after sentences, colons, and semicolons.

These approximations were taught and used as the standard typing techniques in French and English-speaking countries. For example, T. S. Eliot typed rather than wrote the manuscript for his classic The Waste Land between 1920 and 1922, and used only English spacing throughout: double-spaced sentences.

There is, however, considerable variability in the use of the terms, to the extent that they are often used with the meanings reversed. Here are some definitions of French spacing:

- "Additional space at the ends of sentences is called 'French Spacing.' It is a very old practice, having been commonplace in books up through the 19th century"
- "Adding two spaces after a period is called French spacing. French spacing was quite common in books before the 19th century. Later it became the norm for typewritten copy."
- "French spacing: The additional inter-word spacing between sentences can be switched off in TeX and LaTeX with the command \frenchspacing"
- "Additional space at the ends of sentences is called French spacing, ... In typesetting, a thin space set in addition to the word space achieves French spacing.
- "French spacing leaves the same amount of white space after all punctuation marks, but leaves some thin space before the “tall” punctuation marks..."
- "In ordinary spacing a full em occurs at the end of a sentence. In French spacing the end of a sentence is spaced the same as the balance of the words in the line.
- "...French spacing. The insertion of fixed space such as an en or an em between sentences instead of a variable word space."

This 1960 quotation is the result of some contemporary research:

French spacing is tight spacing with equal word spacing throughout a line, i.e., no extra space after a period, colon, etc. The purpose is not only to create a tighter looking, evenly colored page, but more important, to avoid rivers. In some ad shops, French spacing is understood to mean optically equal word spacing. As to the "French" part of the term, this style has nothing to do with France as verified by several French cultural societies and printers. The word was evidently used because anything "French" was considered to be du haut style.

== Movement to single sentence spacing ==
A key change in the publishing industry from the mid-19th century to the mid-20th century was the enormous growth of mass-produced books and magazines. Increasing commercial pressure to reduce the costs, complexity, and lead-time of printing deeply affected the industry, leading to a widening gap between commercial printing and fine printing. For example, T. S. Eliot's The Waste Land was originally published by a high-volume commercial printer according to its house rules and it was not until its third publication that Eliot was satisfied with its typesetting. The underlying reasons were:

- ease and speed, since far less physical type and more importantly far less skilled effort was required
- cost, since less work was required and the condensed text required less paper; the bulk of the cost saving was typesetting-related rather than paper-use-related
- cultural, since new typesetters (and readers) had grown up with typewriters and the standard typists' spacing approximations of good typesetting

Before the First World War, virtually all English-language books were printed following standard typesetters' spacing rules. By the end of the Second World War, most American books and an increasing proportion of English books were printed following the typewriter's English spacing approximation rules. Around this time, the practice of single spacing became more prevalent. There were various circumstances which could have contributed to the change. For example, there was an increase in high-volume low-cost mass-produced printing (e.g., newspapers, pulp novels, magazines). Also, a significant innovation in the typewriter was the breaking of the typewriter "grid" in 1941. “The grid” referred to the uniform spacing of each letter space in the monospaced font used by the typewriter. In 1941, IBM introduced the Executive, a typewriter that used proportional spacing by breaking each cell of the grid into fifths. Although proportional fonts had been used in various forms in typesetting since the invention of movable type, this innovation broke the hold that the monospaced font had over the typewriter, reducing the severity of its mechanical limitations.

During the 1950s, single sentence spacing became the standard commercial practice in mass-print-runs in the United States. However, double sentence spacing approximations were retained in some higher-cost printed works. For example, for reasons of readability, the US government's 1959 official style guide mandated double sentence spacing in all government documents, whether produced by “teletypesetter, reproduction or other method”. Single sentence spacing was introduced by professional printers in the United Kingdom as well. The 1947 version of Penguin Composition Rules stated that all Penguin publications would adhere to the following rules: “All major punctuation marks – full point, colon, and semicolon – should be followed by the same spacing as is used throughout the rest of the line.”

Until about the early 1990s, double sentence spacing was still referred to as English spacing (or “American typewriter spacing”).

== The computer era ==
The introduction and widespread adoption of non-commandline desktop publishing software on personal computers in the mid-1980s eliminated previous cost-restrictions that had helped fuel the switch to single-spacing. There was no longer any material marginal cost associated with typesetting double-spaces, or even multiple-width spaces. Despite this, resistance to double-spaced sentences started to grow among English-language professional designers and typographers as they became more directly involved with typesetting. Traditional French typists' rules continued to be the uncontested norm in French-speaking countries, but English spacing became increasingly deprecated in English-speaking countries.

By the mid-1990s, the term French spacing was occasionally used in America in reference to double sentence spacing. An example of this apparent terminology reversal can be attributed to the University of Chicago Press in 1994. By the mid-2000s this usage had been widely replicated on the Internet, for unclear reasons.

Additionally, there has been a designer-led trend towards closer-fitted text in general. For example, an increasing number of computer font design guidelines now recommend the use of quarter-em spaces rather than third-em spaces. With regard to spacing, modern designers are retracing the steps of the 19th-century design-led typographer William Morris. Morris rejected the restrictions of commercial typesetting which, at the time, demanded traditional typesetting's spacing rules, and, declaring a "rage for beauty", advocated close-set type and dark "colour" (lack of whitespace, creating uniformity of appearance). However, the reason Donald Knuth gave for creating the TeX typesetting system was his dismay on receiving the proofs of a new edition of his book The Art of Computer Programming at the unreadability of the then new close-fitted phototypesetting technology, which he described as "awful" due to its "poor spacing". The leading style guides of Morris's time documented that readers of the time had the same reaction to Morris's output as Knuth did later to phototypesetting's output. De Vinne, for example, wrote in The Practice of Typography:

Printed words need the relief of a surrounding blank as much as figures in a landscape need background or contrast, perspective or atmosphere. (p. 182)
White space is needed to make printing comprehensible. (page 183)

And in Modern Book Composition he wrote:

Unleaded and thin-spaced composition is preferred by the disciples of William Morris, but it is not liked by the average reader, who does need a perceptible white blank between words or lines of print. During the fifteenth century, when thin leads and graduated spaces were almost unknown and but little used, the reading world had its surfeit of close-spaced and solid typesetting. (p. 105)

Varying the spacing between sentences, and using the changing spacing to encode information, are a standard method of steganography, hiding secret information in public documents.

== See also ==
=== General ===
- Sentence spacing
- Sentence spacing in language and style guides
- Sentence spacing in digital media
- Sentence spacing studies
- Orphans and widows
- Style guides
- Typesetting

=== Related history ===
- History of printing
- History of printing in East Asia
- History of Western typography
- Spread of European movable type printing
