= For position only =

Materials used as placeholders in a layout

In graphic design and printing, the phrases for position only or for placement only, or the initialism FPO, indicate materials that have been used as placeholders in a layout prior to it being declared finished and ready for publication.

These placeholders, commonly either blank frames or stock photographs, indicate that as-yet-unavailable images or illustrations will be placed in the final layout. That allows design work to continue without risk that the pagination or other elements of the layout will be changed when the final images become available, and similarly in web design provides a means for developers to finish coding and testing the website without having to wait for the actual image files.

They can also be used to produce proof copies of the layout in order to assess its general appearance, similar to the use in typesetting of generic filler text blocks like "lorem ipsum", which give an indication of how the finished type will look in the layout.

Because of the risk that placeholder material might accidentally be published, it is clearly marked with an FPO indicator in the form of a simulated watermark or overprint, stamp, or the like in the expectation that it will make the placeholder's presence obvious to designers working on the layout; reviewing proof copies; or, as a last resort, checking the finished publication. Preventing the accidental "escape" of FPO material is particularly important when the placeholder used is a stock photograph or other copyrighted work that the publisher does not have permission to use in public.
