= Franciscans of Primitive Observance =

The Franciscans of the Primitive Observance, also known as the Franciscans of the Poor Christ, is an association of the faithful founded in 1995 under the Roman Catholic Archdiocese of Boston that observes the Rule of Saint Francis in the Capuchin tradition.

== History ==
The community was established in 1995 by former members of the Franciscan Friars of the Renewal.

The community later used the name Franciscans of the Poor Christ.

== Governance ==
Peter Giroux has served as the community's General Servant for the majority of the Franciscans of Primitive Observance's existence.

== Controversy ==
In 2000, the Tifft family donated the use of their estate in Vermont to the Franciscans of Primitive Observance to conduct a retreat for their members, during which they conducted exorcisms. The Tifft family alleged that John Sweeney, one of the founding figures, used these and similar occasions to serially sexually abuse and victimize teenage women, including the Tifft's 17-year-old daughter. Sweeney was put on leave in 2004, and subsequently laicized in 2013.

== Women's community ==
Along with the founding of the friars' community out of the Franciscan Friars of the Renewal, six women left the corresponding women's community, the Franciscan Sisters of the Renewal, in 1994, to form the Capuchin Recollect Sisters in New Bedford, Massachusetts. In 1998, they changed their community's name to Capuchin Sisters of Nazareth.
