= Terminal punctuation =

Marks that identify the end of some text

. ? ! ‽

Terminal punctuation

Terminal punctuation refers to the punctuation marks used to identify the end of a portion of text. Terminal punctuation marks are also referred to as end marks and stops.

In languages using the ISO basic Latin alphabet, terminal punctuation marks are defined as the period, the question mark, and the exclamation mark. These punctuation marks may bring sentences to a close. In their widest sense, terminal punctuation marks bring any element of written text to a close, including other conventions, such as abbreviations.

Terminal punctuation in English
		Interrogative	
		No	Yes
Exclamatory	No	Period or Full stop (.)	Question mark (?)
Exclamatory	Yes	Exclamation mark (!)	Interrobang (‽)

== See also ==
- Sentence spacing – Horizontal space between sentences in typeset text
