= Widows and orphans =

In typography, an isolated line of text starting/ending a page

The very short final line of a paragraph composed of a single word (highlighted blue) is a runt. The first line of a paragraph beginning at the end of a page (highlighted green) is called an orphan (sometimes called a widow). The last line of a paragraph continuing on to a new page (highlighted yellow) is a widow (sometimes called an orphan).

In typesetting, widows and orphans are single lines of text from a paragraph that dangle at either the beginning or end of a block of text, or form a very short final line at the end of a paragraph. When split across pages, they occur at either the head or foot of a page (or column), unaccompanied by additional lines from the same paragraph. The pairing of the two terms with their definitions has no consistent standard across the industry; some sources use the opposite meanings to others.

Additionally, runts (which varying sources also call widows or orphans) are cases where a paragraph anywhere on a page ends with a very short final line. They give an impression of excessive empty space between that and the following paragraph.

== Definitions ==
For the purposes of this article, the following meanings are given to the terms. Some sources have these reversed due to a lack of industry standardization.

Widow (sometimes called orphan)
A paragraph-ending line that falls at the beginning of the following page or column, thus separated from the rest of the text. Mnemonically, a widow is "alone at the top" (of the family tree but, in this case, of the page).
Orphan (sometimes called widow)
A paragraph-opening line that appears by itself at the bottom of a page or column, thus separated from the rest of the text. Mnemonically, an orphan is "alone at the bottom" (of the family tree but, in this case, of the page).
Runt (sometimes called widow or orphan)
A word, part of a word, or a very short line that appears by itself at the end of a paragraph. Mnemonically still "alone at the bottom", just this time at the bottom of a paragraph. Orphans of this type give the impression of too much white space between paragraphs.

== Guidelines ==
Regarding page design and the layout of the text, the 15th edition of The Chicago Manual of Style (2003) indicates that an edited manuscript should have neither widows nor orphans, even if their elimination leaves blank space at the bottom of the page or of the column of text. The 16th edition of The Chicago Manual of Style (2011) proposes the acceptability that the layout of some pages can conclude with the first line of a new paragraph at the foot of the page.

The techniques for eliminating widows include:

- Forcing a page break early, producing a shorter page;
- Adjusting the leading, the space between lines of text;
- Adjusting the spacing between words to produce tighter or looser paragraphs;
- Adjusting the hyphenation within the paragraph;
- Adjusting the margins of the page;
- Subtle scaling of the page without distorting the letters;
- Rewriting a portion of the paragraph;
- Reducing the letter-spacing (tracking) of the words;
- Adding a pull quote to the text (usual in magazines); and
- Adding a floating block (figure) to the text, or resizing an existing figure.

An orphan line is more easily deleted, either by inserting a blank line or by forcing a page break to push the orphan line onto the next page, to be part of the paragraph to which the orphan belongs. Similarly, an orphan word at the end of a paragraph can be relocated by forcing one or more words from the preceding text line into the paragraph line of the orphan. In web-publishing, this is typically accomplished by concatenating the words in question with a non-breaking space and, if available, by utilizing the orphans: and widows: attributes in Cascading Style Sheets. Sometimes it can also be useful to add non-breaking spaces to the first two (or few) short words of a paragraph to avoid having a single orphaned word placed to the left or right of a picture or table, while the remainder of the text (with longer words) would only appear after the table.

Most full-feature word processors and page layout applications include an automatic paragraph setting that prevents widows and orphans; thus, an orphan is forced to the top of the next page or column; and the text line preceding a widow is forced to the next page or column. In technical writing, where a single source may be published in different formats, with the viewer's expectation of viewing content in different sizes and resolutions, the paragraph settings automatically prevent widows and orphans. In that situation, one should avoid manual overrides such as inserting empty lines or extra spaces, as they can result in extra white space in the middle of pages after a format change forces repagination.
