= Lettering =

Art of drawing letters

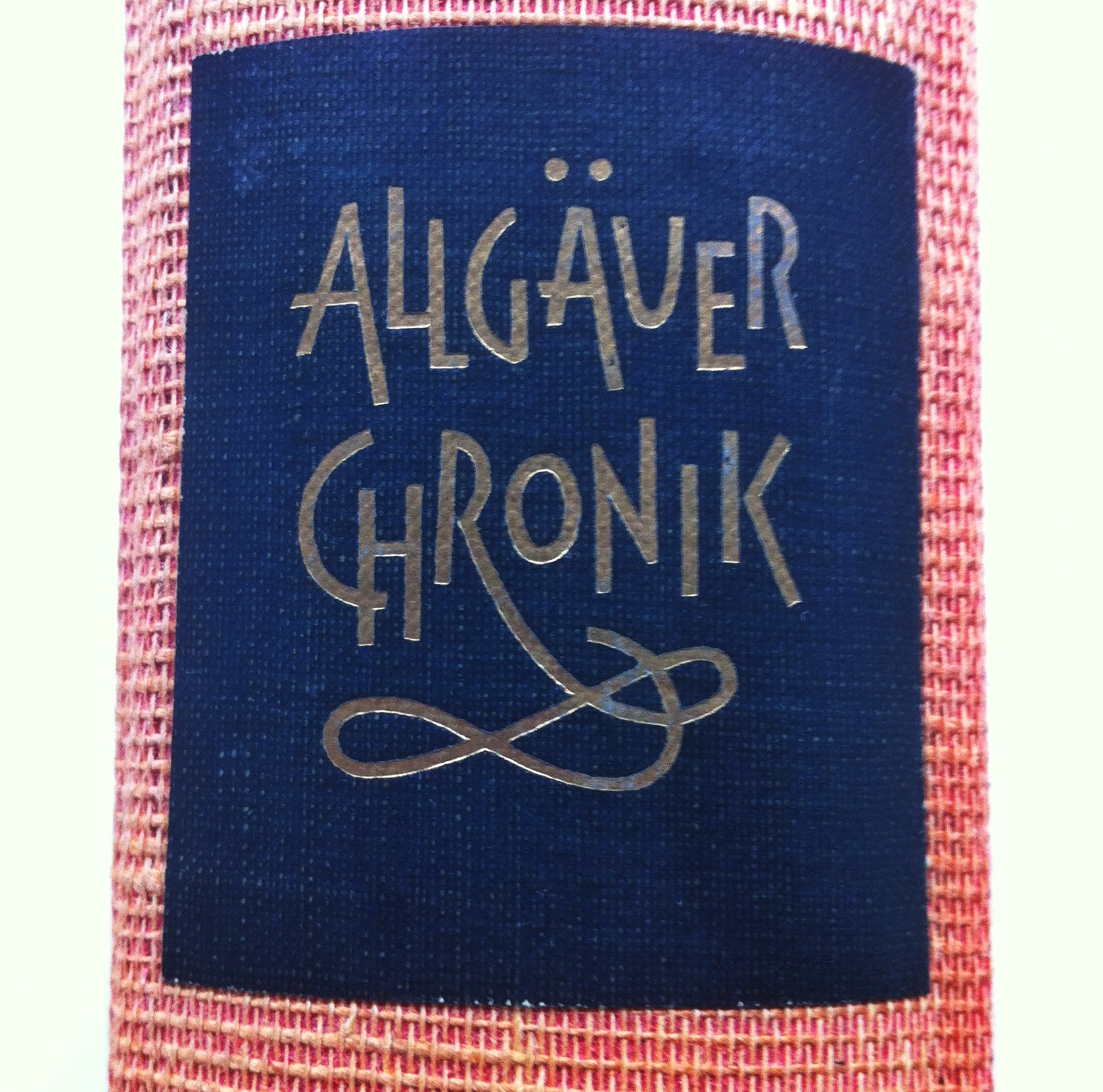
Custom lettering on the spine of a 1960s book

Lettering or handlettering is a term for artfully drawing letters, instead of writing them simply. Each letter is created with attention to detail and has a unique role within a composition. Lettering is created as an image, with letters that are meant to be used in a unique configuration. Lettering words do not always translate into alphabets that can later be used in a typeface, since they are created with a specific word in mind.

== Examples of application ==
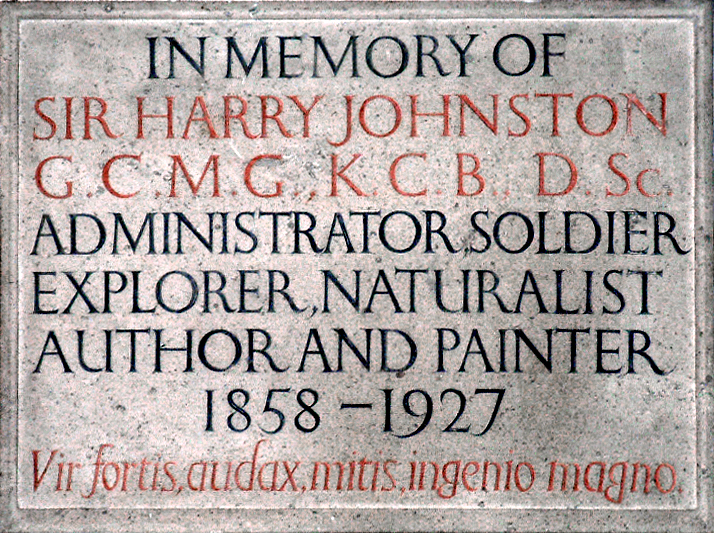
A memorial plaque by Eric Gill

Lettering includes unadorned lettering used for purposes such as blueprints and comic books, as well as decorative lettering such as sign painting and custom graphics, posters, for a letterhead or business wordmark, lettering in stone, lettering for advertisements, fileteado, graffiti, or on chalkboards.

Lettering may be drawn, incised, applied using stencils, or using computer software. Lettering that was not created using computers is commonly referred to as hand-lettering. The term 'letter cutting' is used particularly for inscriptions cut in stone, such as for a memorial plaque.

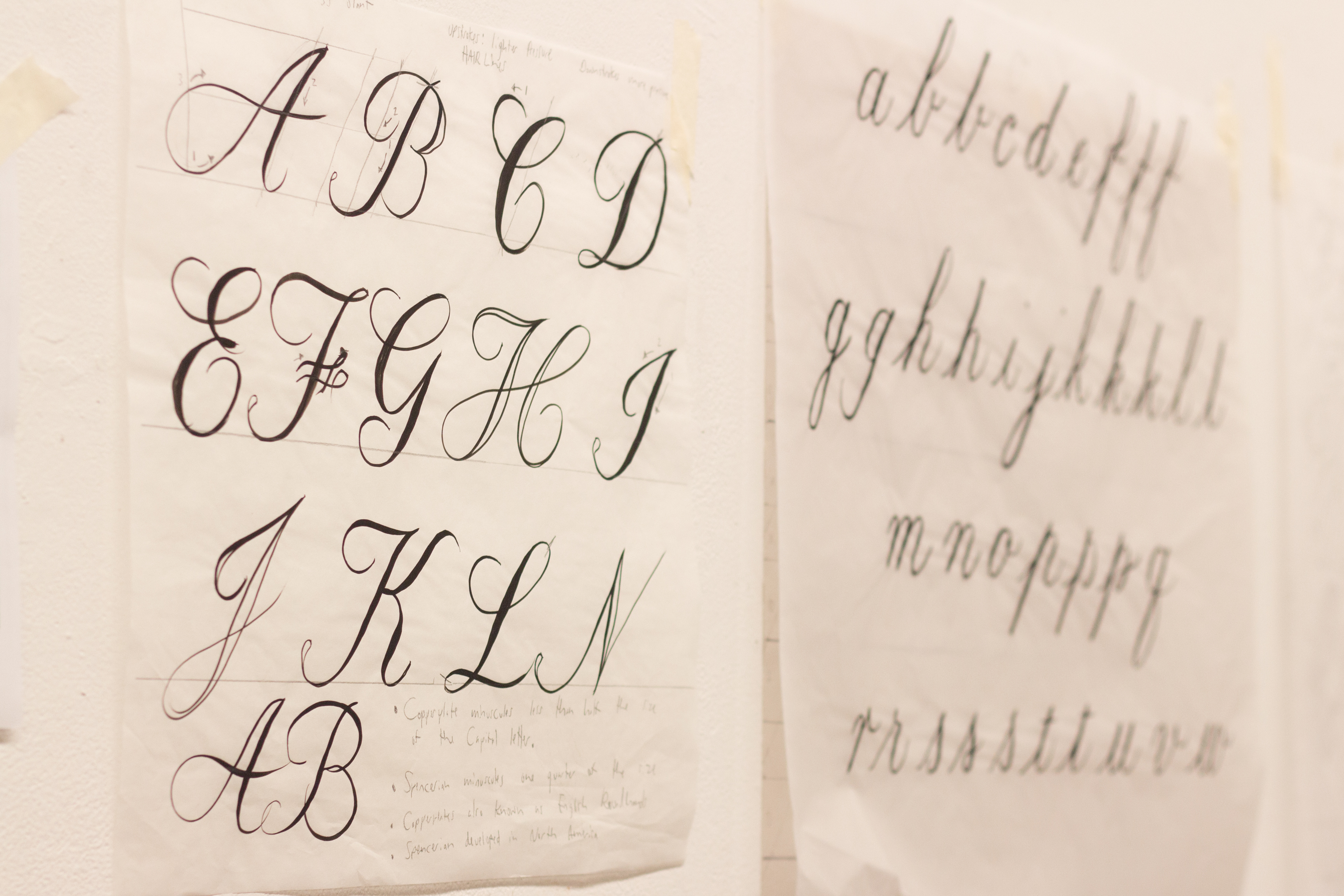
Brush lettering practice by artist Emmanuel Sevilla

In the past, almost all decorative letterforms other than those on paper were created as custom or hand-painted lettering. The use of fonts in place of lettering has increased due to new printing methods, phototypesetting digital typesetting and wide-format printers, which allow fonts to be printed at any desired size. Some modern digital fonts are based on earlier custom lettering.

== Related artforms ==
Calligraphy is based on penmanship; it’s essentially "writing letters." Lettering, on the other hand, is based on draftsmanship, i.e. "drawing letters."

— Joseph Alessio

Lettering can be confused with similar terms, such as calligraphy or typography.

Calligraphy is known as a more rigid process, that requires learning the formal shapes of letters and often combining thick downstrokes with thin upstrokes. This style of writing is generally created with dip pens and inks. Some calligraphers and hand-letterers say that calligraphy created with brush pens becomes lettering or faux-calligraphy, but others believe that the approach used to create the letters is more important than the tools used to do so.

Typography is arranging type to make written language legible, readable and appealing when displayed. The arrangement of type involves selecting typefaces, point sizes, line lengths, line spacing, letter spacing, and spaces between pairs of letters.

One particular lettering website defines the three terms as follows: Lettering is the art of drawing letters, calligraphy is the art of writing letters and is related to the idea of penmanship, and typography is a repeated system of letters or the art of arranging type.

== See also ==
- Typeface anatomy, the graphic elements that make up letters in a typeface
