= Doublespace (disambiguation) =

DoubleSpace is a disk compression utility supplied with MS-DOS starting from version 6.0.

Doublespace may also refer to:

- Double spacing, the inclusion of a full line of space between each line of text
- Double spacing at the end of sentences, a typographical convention
