= White space (visual arts) =

Portion of a page left unmarked

In page layout and illustration, white space (or often negative space) is the portion of a page left unmarked: margins, gutters, and space between columns, lines of type, graphics, figures, or objects drawn or depicted. It is not necessarily actually white if the background is of a different colour. The term arises from graphic design practice, where printing processes generally use white paper. White space may be affirmatively an element of design rather than just space left blank.

When space is at a premium, such as in some types of magazine, newspaper, and yellow pages advertising, white space is restricted in order to get as much information onto the page as possible. A page full of text or graphics with very little white space may appear cluttered, and be difficult to read. Some designs compensate for restricted white space by use of leading and typeface. Extensive white space may be left intentionally, with the purpose of giving an appearance deemed classic, elegant, or rich.

== See also ==
- Composition (visual arts)
- Horror vacui (art)
- Ma (negative space) – Japanese artistic concept
- Minimalism (visual arts)
- Negative space
- Type color
