= Kaligrafos =

Non-profit organization

Kaligrafos is a non-profit organization which was founded in 1980 to promote the lettering arts. The guild is based in the Dallas / Fort Worth, Texas area, where monthly meetings are held. A variety of calligraphy workshops and classes are offered to novices and masters alike.

== Executive Board ==
The executive board for the 2023-24 is,

President: Randy Stewart

Vice President: June Baty

Secretary: Betty Barna

Treasurer: Sherry Barber

== Presidents ==
The President as of 2023 is Randy Stewart

The past presidents were,

Presidents
Names	Years served
Susie-Melissa Cherry	1980-81
Alan Furber	1981-83
Susie Egnew	1983-84
Paul Siegel	1984-85
Betty Barna	1985-87 2012-2014
Sue Bohlin	1987-89
Catherine Burkhard	1989-91
Teri Fulton	1991-92 1998-99
Karen Kaufman	1992-1993
Cheryl Darrow	1993-94
James Walters	1994-95 1997-98 2004-05
John Parramore	1996-97
Grace Ann Vanderpool	1999-2001
Dick Mussett	2001-02
Donna Sabolovic	2002-04
June Baty	2005-06
Kathleen Setina	2006-08
Sherry Barber	2008–2012
Thomas Burns	2014-2018
Jeri Wright	2018-2022
Randy Stewart	2022-
