= Textblock =

Textblock (also text-block or text block) may refer to:

- Text-block (bookbinding), the main collection of leaves making up a codex, to which a cover is added during bookbinding.
- Text-block (typography), the main text in a page layout, as contrasted with the margins.
- Multi-line text strings in Java (software platform).
