= Sentence spacing =

Horizontal space between sentences in typeset text

Sentence spacing concerns how spaces are inserted between sentences in typeset text and is a matter of typographical convention. Since the introduction of movable-type printing in Europe, various sentence spacing conventions have been used in languages with a Latin alphabet. These include a normal word space (as between the words in a sentence), a single enlarged space, and two full spaces.

Until the 20th century, publishing houses and printers in many countries used additional space between sentences. There were exceptions to this traditional spacing method – some printers used spacing between sentences that was no wider than word spacing. This was French spacing, synonymous with single-space sentence spacing until the late 20th century. With the introduction of the typewriter in the late 19th century, typists used two spaces between sentences to mimic the style used by traditional typesetters. While wide sentence spacing was phased out in the printing industry in the mid-20th century, the practice continued on typewriters and later on computers. Perhaps because of this, many modern sources now incorrectly claim that wide spacing was created for the typewriter.

The desired or correct sentence spacing is often debated, but most sources now state that an additional space is not necessary or desirable. From around 1950, single sentence spacing became standard in books, magazines, and newspapers, and the majority of style guides that use a Latin-derived alphabet as a language base now prescribe or recommend the use of a single space after the concluding punctuation of a sentence. However, some sources still state that additional spacing is correct or acceptable. Some people prefer double sentence spacing because that was how they were taught to type. The few direct studies conducted since 2002 have produced inconclusive results as to which convention is more readable.

== History ==
=== Traditional typesetting ===
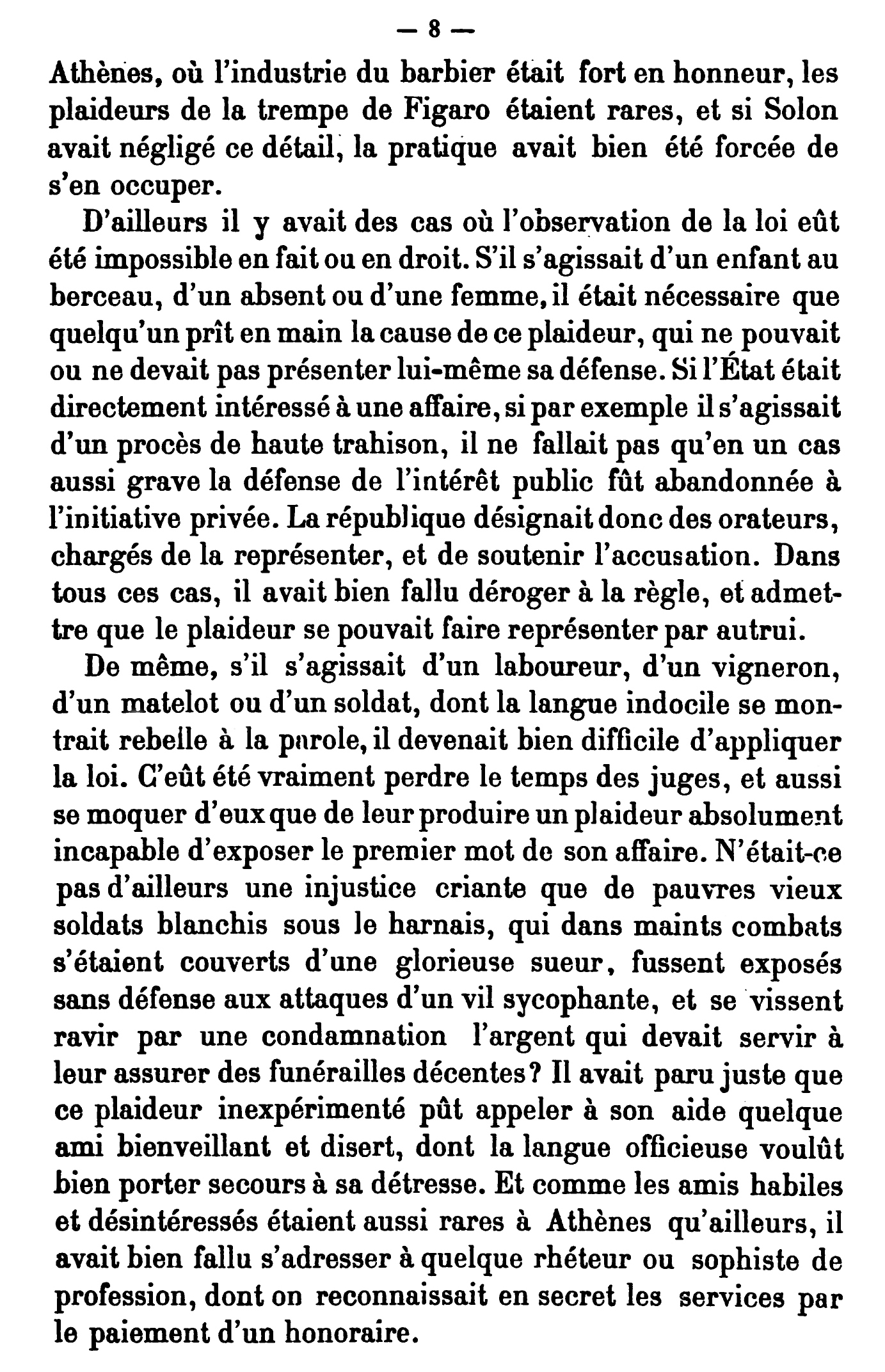
↑ (1874) typeset text
↓ (1909) sentences with at least an em-space between them

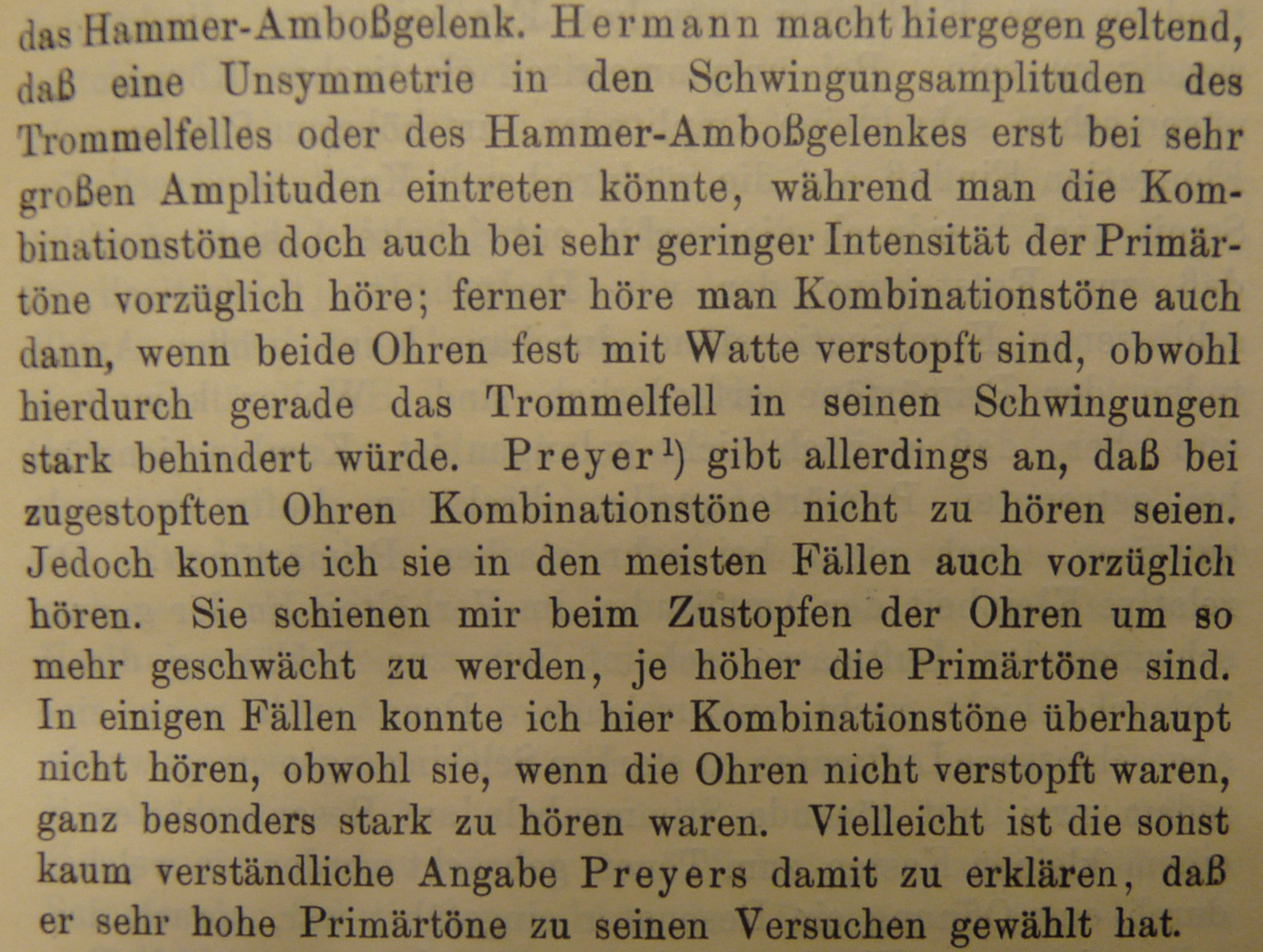

Shortly after the invention of movable type, highly variable spacing was created, which could create spaces of any size and allowed for perfectly even justification. Early American, English, and other European typesetters' style guides (also known as printers' rules) specified spacing standards that were all essentially identical from the 18th century onwards. These guides – e.g., Jacobi in the U.K. (1890) and MacKellar, Harpel, and De Vinne (1866–1901) in the U.S. – indicated that sentences should be em-spaced, and that words should be 1/3 or 1/2 em-spaced. The relative size of the sentence spacing would vary depending on the size of the word spaces and the justification needs. For most countries, this remained the standard for published work until the 20th century. Yet, even in this period, there were publishing houses that used a standard word space between sentences.

=== Mechanical type and the advent of the typewriter ===
Mechanical type systems introduced near the end of the 19th century, such as the Linotype and Monotype machines, allowed for some variable sentence spacing similar to hand composition. Just as these machines revolutionized the mass production of text, the advent of the typewriter around the same time revolutionized the creation of personal and business documents. But the typewriters' mechanical limitations did not allow variable spacing – typists could only choose the number of times they pressed the space bar. Typists in some English-speaking countries initially learned to insert three spaces between sentences to approximate the wider sentence spacing used in traditional printing, but later settled on two spaces, a practice which continued throughout the 20th century. This became known as "English spacing" and marked a divergence from French typists, who continued to use French spacing.

=== Transition to single spacing ===
In the early 20th century some printers began using one-and-a-half interword spaces (an "en quad") to separate sentences. This standard continued in use, to some extent, into the 1990s.

Magazines, newspapers, and books began to adopt the single-space convention in the United States in the 1940s and in the United Kingdom in the 1950s. Typists did not move to single spacing simultaneously.

Technological advances began affecting sentence spacing methods. In 1941 IBM introduced the Executive, a typewriter capable of proportional spacing, which had been used in professional typesetting for hundreds of years. This innovation broke the hold that the monospaced font had on the typewriter, reducing the severity of its mechanical limitations. However, this innovation did not spread throughout the typewriter industry; the majority of mechanical typewriters, including all the widely distributed models, remained monospaced, while a small minority of special models carried the innovations. By the 1960s, electronic phototypesetting systems ignored runs of white space in text. This was also true for the World Wide Web, as HTML normally ignores additional spacing, although in 2011 the CSS 2.1 standard officially added an option that can preserve additional spaces. In the 1980s, desktop publishing software provided the average writer with more advanced formatting tools.

== Modern literature ==
=== Typography ===
Early positions on typography (the "arrangement and appearance of text") supported traditional spacing techniques in English publications. In 1954 Geoffrey Dowding's book Finer Points in the Spacing and Arrangement of Type underscored the widespread shift from a single enlarged em space to a standard word space between sentences.

With the advent of the computer age, typographers began deprecating double spacing, even in monospaced text. In 1989 Desktop Publishing by Design stated that "typesetting requires only one space after periods, question marks, exclamation points, and colons" and identified single sentence spacing as a typographic convention. Stop Stealing Sheep & Find Out How Type Works (1993) and Designing with Type: The Essential Guide to Typography (2006) both indicate that uniform spacing should be used between words, including between sentences.

More recent works on typography weigh in strongly. Ilene Strizver, founder of the Type Studio, says: "Forget about tolerating differences of opinion: typographically speaking, typing two spaces before the start of a new sentence is absolutely, unequivocally wrong." The Complete Manual on Typography (2003) states that "The typewriter tradition of separating sentences with two-word spaces after a period has no place in typesetting" and that the single space is "standard typographic practice". The Elements of Typographic Style (2004) advocates a single space between sentences, noting that "your typing as well as your typesetting will benefit from unlearning this quaint [double spacing] Victorian habit".

David Jury's book About Face: Reviving the Rules of Typography (2004, published in Switzerland) clarifies the contemporary typographic position on sentence spacing:

Word spaces, preceding or following punctuation, should be optically adjusted to appear to be of the same value as a standard word space. If a standard word space is inserted after a full point or a comma, then, optically, this produces a space of up to 50% wider than that of other word spaces within a line of type. This is because these punctuation marks carry space above them, which, when added to the adjacent standard word spaces, combines to create a visually larger space. Some argue that the "additional" space after a comma and full point serves as a "pause signal" for the reader. But this is unnecessary (and visually disruptive) since the pause signal is provided by the punctuation mark itself.

=== Style and language guides ===
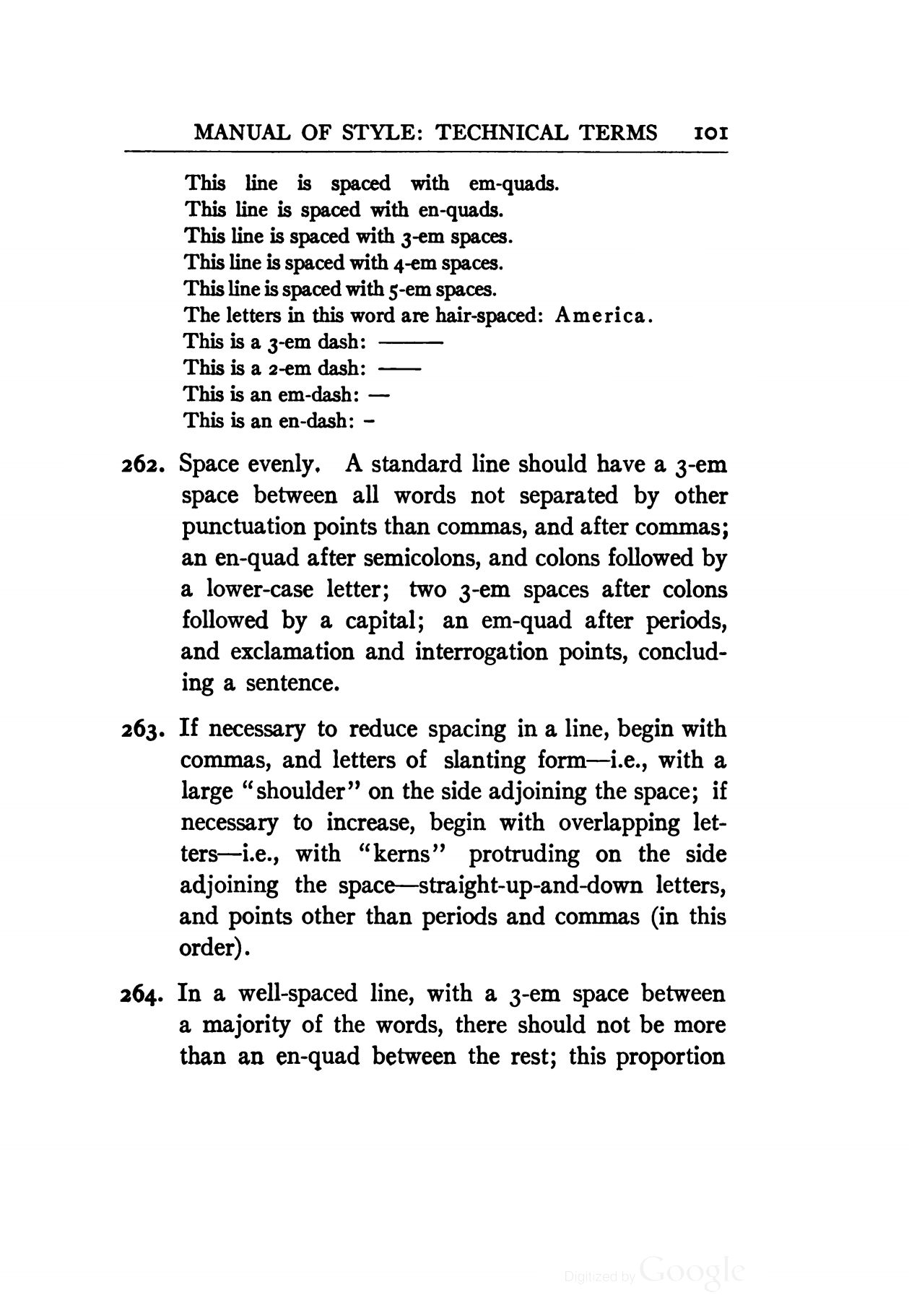
Traditional spacing examples from the 1911 Chicago Manual of Style

==== Style guides ====
Early style guides for typesetting used a wider space between sentences than between words: "traditional spacing", as shown here. During the 20th century, style guides commonly mandated two spaces between sentences for typewritten manuscripts, which were used prior to professionally typesetting the work. As computer desktop publishing became commonplace, typewritten manuscripts became less relevant, and most style guides stopped making distinctions between manuscripts and final typeset products. In the same period, style guides began changing their guidance on sentence spacing. The 1969 edition of the Chicago Manual of Style used em spaces between sentences in its text; by the 2003 edition it had changed to single sentence spacing for both manuscript and print. By the 1980s the United Kingdom's Hart's Rules (1983) had shifted to single sentence spacing. Other style guides followed suit in the 1990s. Soon after the beginning of the 21st century, the majority of style guides had changed to indicate that only one word space was proper between sentences.

Modern style guides provide standards and guidance for the written language. These works are important to writers, since "virtually all professional editors work closely with one of them in editing a manuscript for publication". Late editions of comprehensive style guides, such as the Oxford Style Manual (2003) in the United Kingdom and the Chicago Manual of Style (2010) in the United States, provide standards for a wide variety of writing and design topics, including sentence spacing. The majority of style guides now prescribe the use of a single space after terminal punctuation in final written works and publications. A few style guides allow double sentence spacing for draft work, and the Gregg Reference Manual makes room for double and single sentence spacing based on author preferences. Web design guides do not usually provide guidance on this topic, as "HTML refuses to recognize double spaces altogether". These works themselves follow the current publication standard of single sentence spacing.

The European Union's Interinstitutional Style Guide (2008) indicates that single sentence spacing is to be used in all European Union publications (all 23 languages). For the English language, the European Commission's English Style Guide (2010) states that sentences are always single-spaced. The Style Manual: For Authors, Editors and Printers (2007), first published in 1966 by the Commonwealth Government Printing Office of Australia, stipulates that only one space is used after "sentence-closing punctuation" and that "Programs for word processing and desktop publishing offer more sophisticated, variable spacing, so this practice of double spacing is now avoided because it can create distracting gaps on a page."

National languages not covered by an authoritative language academy typically have multiple style guides, only some of which may discuss sentence spacing. This is the case in the United Kingdom. The Oxford Style Manual (2003) and the Modern Humanities Research Association's MHRA Style Guide (2002) state that only single spacing should be used. In Canada both the English- and French-language sections of the Canadian Style, A Guide to Writing and Editing (1997), prescribe single sentence spacing. In the United States, many style guides, such as the Chicago Manual of Style (2003), allow only single sentence spacing. The most important style guide in Italy, Il Nuovo Manuale di Stile (2009), does not address sentence spacing, but the Guida di Stile Italiano (2010), the official guide for Microsoft translation, tells users to use single sentence spacing "instead of the double spacing used in the United States".

==== Language guides ====
Some languages, such as French and Spanish, have academies that set language rules. Their publications typically address orthography and grammar as opposed to matters of typography. Style guides are less relevant for such languages, as their academies set prescriptive rules. For example, the Académie française publishes the Dictionnaire de l'Académie française for French speakers worldwide. The 1992 edition does not provide guidance on sentence spacing but is single-sentence-spaced throughout, consistent with historical French spacing. The Spanish language is similar. The most important body within the Association of Spanish Language Academies, the Royal Spanish Academy, publishes the Diccionario de la lengua española, which is viewed as prescriptive for the Spanish language worldwide. The 2001 edition does not provide sentence-spacing guidance, but is itself single-sentence-spaced. The German language manual Empfehlungen des Rats für deutsche Rechtschreibung ("Recommendations of the Council for German Orthography"; 2006) does not address sentence spacing. The manual itself uses one space after terminal punctuation. Additionally, the Duden, the German-language dictionary most commonly used in Germany, indicates that double sentence spacing is an error.

=== Grammar guides ===
A few reference grammars address sentence spacing, as increased spacing between words is punctuation in itself. Most do not. Grammar guides typically cover terminal punctuation and the proper construction of sentences but not the spacing between sentences. Moreover, many modern grammar guides are designed for quick reference and refer users to comprehensive style guides for additional matters of writing style. For example, the Pocket Idiot's Guide to Grammar and Punctuation (2005) points users to style guides such as the MLA Style Manual for consistency in formatting work and for all other "editorial concerns". The Grammar Bible (2004) states that "The modern system of English punctuation is by no means simple. A book that covers all the bases would need to be of considerable breadth and weight and anyone interested in such a resource is advised to consult the Chicago Manual of Style."

== Computer era ==
In the computer era, spacing between sentences is handled in several different ways by various software packages. Some systems accept whatever the user types, while others attempt to alter the spacing or use the user input as a method of detecting sentences. Computer-based word processors and typesetting software such as troff and TeX allow users to arrange text in a manner previously available only to professional typesetters.

The text-editing environment in Emacs by default uses a double space following a period to identify the end of sentences unambiguously; the double-space convention prevents confusion with periods within sentences that signify abbreviations. How Emacs recognizes the end of a sentence is controlled by the settings sentence-end-double-space and sentence-end.

The Unix typesetter program Troff uses two spaces to mark the end of a sentence. This allows the typesetter to distinguish sentence endings from abbreviations and to typeset them differently. Early versions of Troff, which typeset only in fixed-width fonts, would automatically add a second space between sentences, which were detected based on the combination of terminal punctuation and a line feed.

In the April 2020 update, Microsoft Word started highlighting two spaces after a period as an error and offers a correction of one space.

Multiple spaces are eliminated by default in most World Wide Web content, whether or not they are associated with sentences. There are options for preserving spacing, such as the CSS white-space property, and the <pre> tag.

== Controversy ==
James Felici, author of the Complete Manual of Typography, says the topic of sentence spacing is "the debate that refuses to die ... In all my years of writing about type, it's still the question I hear most often, and a search of the web will find threads galore on the subject".

Many people are opposed to single sentence spacing for various reasons. Some state that the habit of double spacing is too deeply ingrained to change. Others claim that additional space between sentences improves the aesthetics or readability of text. Proponents of double sentence spacing also say that some publishers may still require double-spaced manuscript submissions from authors. A key example noted is the screenwriting industry's monospaced standard for screenplay manuscripts, Courier, 12-point font, although some works on screenwriting indicate that Courier is merely preferred, and proportional fonts may still be used. Some reliable sources state simply that writers should follow their particular style guide, but proponents of double spacing caution that publishers' guidance takes precedence, including those that ask for double-sentence-spaced manuscripts.

One of the most popular arguments against wider sentence spacing is that it was created for monospaced fonts of the typewriter and is no longer needed with modern proportional fonts. However, proportional fonts existed together with wide sentence spacing for centuries before the typewriter and remained for decades after its invention. When the typewriter was first introduced, typists were most commonly taught to use three spaces between sentences. This gradually shifted to two spaces, while the print industry remained unchanged in its wide em-spaced sentences. Some sources now state it is acceptable for monospaced fonts to be single-spaced today, although other references continue to specify double spacing for monospaced fonts. The double-space typewriter convention has been taught in schools in typing classes and remains the practice in many cases. Some voice concern that students will later be forced to relearn how to type.

Most style guides indicate that single sentence spacing is proper for final or published work today, and most publishers require manuscripts to be submitted as they will appear in publication: single sentence spacing. Writing sources typically recommend that prospective authors remove extra spaces before submitting manuscripts, although other sources state that publishers will use software to remove the spaces before final publication.

== Effects on readability and legibility ==
Claims abound regarding the legibility and readability of the single- and double-sentence spacing methods by proponents on both sides. Supporters of single-spacing assert that familiarity with the current standard in books, magazines, and the Web enhances readability, that double spacing looks strange in text using proportional fonts, and that the "rivers" and "holes" caused by double spacing impair readability. Proponents of double sentence spacing say the extra space between sentences enhances readability by providing clearer breaks between sentences and making text appear more legible.

However, typographic opinions are typically anecdotal with no basis in evidence. "Opinions are not always safe guides to legibility of print", and when direct studies are conducted, anecdotal opinions (even those of experts) can turn out to be false. Text that seems legible (visually pleasing at first glance) may be shown to actually impair reading effectiveness when subjected to scientific study.

=== Studies ===
Direct studies on sentence spacing include those by Loh, Branch, Shewanown, and Ali (2002); and Clinton, Branch, Holschuh, and Shewanown (2003); with results favoring neither single, double, nor triple spacing. The 2002 study tested participants' reading speed for passages of on-screen text with single and double sentence spacing. The authors said that "the 'double space group' consistently took longer time to finish than the 'single space' group" but concluded that "there was not enough evidence to suggest that a significant difference exists". The 2003 study analyzed on-screen single, double, and triple spacing. In both cases the authors said there was insufficient evidence to draw a conclusion. Ni, Branch, Chen, and Clinton conducted a similar study in 2009 using identical spacing variables. The authors concluded that the "results provided insufficient evidence that time and comprehension differ significantly among different conditions of spacing between sentences". A 2018 study of 60 students found that those who used two-word spaces between sentences read the same text 3% faster than with a monospaced font (Courier New).

=== Related studies ===
There are other studies that could be relevant to sentence spacing, such as the familiarity of typographic conventions on readability. Some studies indicate that "tradition" can increase the readability of text, and that reading is disrupted when conventional printing arrangements are disrupted or violated. The standard for the Web and published books, magazines, and newspapers is single sentence spacing.

David Jury's book What is Typography? notes: "Changes in spacing either between letters and words, or between the words only ... do not appear to affect legibility. [These rather extraordinary conclusions are contrary to all other surveys on readability of texts.]"

An example of the "river" effect in justified text

A widespread observation is that increased sentence spacing creates rivers or "holes" within text, making it visually unattractive, distracting, and difficult to locate the end of sentences. Comprehensive works on typography describe the negative effect on readability caused by inconsistent spacing, which is supported in a 1981 study which found that "comprehension was significantly less accurate with the river condition". Another 1981 study on cathode-ray tube (CRT) displays concluded that "more densely packed text is read more efficiently ... than is more loosely packed text". This statement is supported in other works as well. Canadian typographer Geoffrey Dowding suggests possible explanations of this phenomenon:

A carefully composed text page appears as an orderly series of strips of black separated by horizontal channels of white space. Conversely, in a slovenly setting the tendency is for the page to appear as a grey and muddled pattern of isolated spats, this effect being caused by the over-widely separated words. The normal, easy, left-to-right movement of the eye is slowed down simply because of this separation; further, the short letters and serifs are unable to discharge an important function: keeping the eye on "the line". The eye also tends to be confused by a feeling of vertical emphasis, that is, an up-and-down movement induced by the relative isolation of the words and consequent insistence of the ascending and descending letters. This movement is further emphasized by those "rivers" of white which are the inseparable and ugly accompaniment of all carelessly set text matter.

Some studies suggest that readability can be improved by breaking sentences into separate units of thought, or by varying the internal spacing of sentences. Mid-20th-century research on this topic resulted in inconclusive findings. A 1980 study split sentences into one- to five‑word phrases with additional spacing between segments. The study concluded that there was no significant difference in efficacy, but that a wider study was needed. Numerous other similar studies in 1951–1991 resulted in disparate and inconclusive findings. Finally, although various studies have been conducted on the readability of proportional vs. monospaced fonts, the studies typically did not decrease sentence spacing when using proportional fonts, or did not specify whether sentence spacing was changed.

== See also ==
- Leading – In typography, spacing between lines
- Scriptio continua – Style of writing without spaces between words

== Notes and references ==
=== Bibliography ===
- Académie française (1992). Dictionnaire de l'Académie française: Tome 1, A–Enz (in French) (Neuvième ed.). Paris: Artheme Fayard. 830 pages. ISBN 978-2-7433-0407-2.
- Adams, J. Michael; Faux, David D.; Rieber, Lloyd J. (1996). Printing Technology (4th ed.). Delmar Publishers. ISBN 978-0827369078.
- Allen, Moira (2001). "A Quick Guide to Manuscript Format". Writing-World.com. Archived from the original on 21 October 2013.
- American Medical Association (2007). AMA Manual of Style: A Guide for Authors and Editors (10th ed.). New York: Oxford University Press. 1032. ISBN 978-0-19-517633-9.
- American Political Science Association Committee on Publications (August 2006). Style Manual for Political Science (PDF). Washington, DC: American Political Science Association. ISBN 978-1-878147-33-2. Archived from the original (PDF) on 21 August 2010.
- Publication Manual of the American Psychological Association (6th ed.). American Psychological Association. 2010. 272 pages. ISBN 978-1-4338-0561-5.
- "Corrections to the First Printing of the Publication Manual of the American Psychological Association" (PDF). American Psychological Association. July 2009. Archived (PDF) from the original on 13 August 2015.
- American Psychological Association. "Corrected Sample Papers" (PDF). American Psychological Association. Archived (PDF) from the original on 25 November 2015.
- American Psychological Association (8 October 2009). "Errors in APA Style Rules, Clarifications" (PDF). Corrections to the First Printing of the Publication Manual of the American Psychological Association, Sixth Edition (July 2009). American Psychological Association. Archived (PDF) from the original on 13 August 2015.
- American Sociological Association (1997). American Sociological Association Style Guide (2nd ed.). Washington, D.C.: American Sociological Association. ISBN 978-0-912764-29-0.
- Association of Legal Writing Directors (ALWD) and Darby Dickerson (2006). ALWD Citation Manual (3rd ed.). New York: Aspen Publishers. 608 pages. ISBN 978-0-7355-5571-6.
- Associated Press, ed. (2004). The Associated Press Stylebook (43rd ed.). New York: Basic Books. ISBN 978-0-465-01262-6.
- Baugh, L. Sue (2005). Essentials of English Grammar: The Quick Guide to Good English (3rd ed.). New York: McGraw Hill. 176 pages. ISBN 978-0-07-145708-8.
- Bever, Thomas G.; Jandreau, Steven; Burwell, Rebecca; et al. (1991). "Spacing Printed Text to Isolate Major Phrases Improves Readability". Visible Language. 25 (1): 75–87.
- Bibliographisches Institut AG (2010). "Über Duden" (in German). Archived from the original on 12 December 2015.
- Bibliographisches Institut AG (2010). "Duden – Deutsche Sprache" (in German). Archived from the original on 8 January 2010.
- Bishop, Henry Gold (1895). The Practical Printer: A Book of Instruction for Beginners; a Book of Reference for the More Advanced (3rd ed.). Albany: Oneonta, N.Y., H. G. Bishop.
- Black, Allison; Watts, Darren (1993). "Proofreading Monospaced and Proportionally-spaced Typefaces". Visible Language. 27 (3): 364–377.
- Bricker, Dave (27 March 2013). "How Many Spaces After a Period? Ending the Debate". Archived from the original on 17 April 2020.
- Bringhurst, Robert (2004). The Elements of Typographic Style (3.0 ed.). Washington and Vancouver: Hartley & Marks. 352 pages. ISBN 978-0-88179-206-5.
- Campbell, A.J.; Marchetti, F.M.; Mewhort, D.J.K. (1981). "Reading Speed and Text Production: A Note on Right-Justification Techniques". Ergonomics. 24 (8): 633–640. doi:10.1080/00140138108924885.
- Carrada, Luisa (2010). "Il mio scaffale: i libri più utili per lo scrittore professionale". Il Mestiere di Scrivere (in Italian). Archived from the original on 14 February 2010.
- Christian, Darrell; Jacobsen, Sally; Minthorn, David, eds. (2009). The AP [Associated Press] Stylebook and Briefing on Media Law (44th ed.). Philadelphia: Basic Books. 416. ISBN 978-0-465-01262-6.
- Clinton, Gregory; Branch, Robert Maribe; Holschuh, D.; Shewanown, S. (2003). Online Reading Performance Time as a Function of Text Layout: Roundtable Paper. 2003 AECT Leadership & Technology International Convention, Anaheim, Ca.
- Columbia Law Review; Harvard Law Review; University of Pennsylvania Law Review; Yale Law review, eds. (2005). The Bluebook: A Uniform System of Citation. Massachusetts: The Harvard Law Review Association.
- Council for German Orthography. "Deutsche Rechtschreibung" [German Orthography] (PDF) (in German). Archived from the original (PDF) on 25 January 2012.
- Craig, James; Scala, Irene Korol (2006). Designing With Type: The Essential Guide to Typography (5th ed.). New York: Watson-Guptill. 176 pages. ISBN 978-0-8230-1413-2.
- Cutts, Martin (2009). Oxford Guide to Plain English (Third ed.). New York: Oxford University Press. ISBN 978-0-19-955850-6.
- De Vinne, Theodore Low (1901). The Practice of Typography: Correct Composition: A Treatise on Spelling Abbreviations, the Compounding and Division of Words, the Proper Use of Figures and Numerals, Italic and Capital Letters, Notes, Etc., With Observations on Punctuation and Proof-Reading (Second ed.). New York: Century Company.
- Dodd, Robin (2006). From Gutenberg to Open Type: An Illustrated History of Type from the Earliest Letterforms to the Latest Digital Fonts. Vancouver: Hartley & Marks. 192 pages. ISBN 978-0-88179-210-2.
- Dowding, Geoffrey (1995). Finer Points in the Spacing & Arrangement of Type (Revised ed.). Vancouver, BC: Hartley & Marks Publishers. 90 pages. ISBN 978-0-88179-119-8.
- Dundurn Press in Co-operation with Public Works and the Government Services Canada Translation Bureau (1997). The Canadian Style: A Guide to Writing and Editing. Toronto and Oxford: J. Kirk Howard. 312 pages. ISBN 978-1-55002-276-6.
- Eckersley, Richard; Ellertson, Charles M.; Angstaldt, Richard; Hendel, Richard (1994). Glossary of Typesetting Terms. University of Chicago Press. ISBN 978-0-226-18371-8.
- Economist (2005). The Economist Style Guide. London: Profile Books. 256 pages. ISBN 978-1-86197-916-2.
- Einsohn, Amy (2006). The Copyeditor's Handbook: A Guide for Book Publishing and Corporate Communications (2nd ed.). Berkeley, Los Angeles, London: University of California Press. 574 pages. ISBN 978-0-520-24688-1.
- European Commission Directorate-General for Translation (April 2010). "English Style Guide: A Handbook for Authors and Translators in the European Commission" (PDF). European Commission. Archived from the original (PDF) on 5 December 2010.
- Felici, James (2003). The Complete Manual of Typography. Berkeley, CA: Peachpit Press. 384 pages. ISBN 978-0-321-12730-3.
- Felici, James (24 August 2009). "To Double-Space or Not to Double-Space". CreativePro.com. Printingforless.com and CreativePro.com31 March 2010. Archived from the original on 6 April 2015.
- Flinn, Denny Martin (1999). How Not to Write a Screenplay: 101 Common Mistakes Most Screenwriters Make. New York: Crown Publishing. 240 pages. ISBN 978-1-58065-015-1.
- Fogarty, Mignon (2008). Grammar Girl's Quick and Dirty Tips for Better Writing. New York: Holt Paperbacks. 240. ISBN 978-0-8050-8831-1.
- Fogarty, Mignon (2009). The Grammar Devotional: Daily Tips for Successful Writing from Grammar Girl. New York: Holt Paperbacks. ISBN 978-0-8050-9165-6.
- Fondiller, Shirley; Nerone, Barbara J. (2007). Health Professionals Style Manual. New York: Springer Publishing. 152 pages. ISBN 978-0-8261-0207-2.
- "5.2 Commenting Your Work". GNU Coding Standards. Free Software Foundation. 12 April 2010. Archived from the original on 13 May 2010.
- Garner, Bryan A. (2009). Garner's Modern American Usage (3rd ed.). Oxford: Oxford University Press. ISBN 978-0-19-538275-4.
- Garner, Bryan A.; Newman, Jeff; Jackson, Tiger (2006). The Redbook: A Manual on Legal Style (2nd ed.). Thompson West. 1008. ISBN 978-0-314-16891-7.
- Haber, Ralph Norman; Haber, Lyn R. (1981). "Visual Components of the Reading Process". Visible Language. 15 (2): 147–182.
- Haley, Allan (June–July 2006). "Typographic Details". Dynamic Graphics. WebMediaBrands Inc. Archived from the original on 13 June 2006.
- Hart, Horace (1893). Hart's Rules for Compositors and Readers: Which are to be Observed in All Cases Where No Special Instructions are Given (First ed.). Oxford: Clarendon Press. Archived from the original on 3 May 2003.
- Hart, Horace (1983). "Hart's Rules for Compositors and Readers at the University Press, Oxford" (Thirty-ninth ed.). Oxford Editorial.
- Harpel, Oscar (1870). Harpel's Typograph, or Book of Specimens Containing Useful Information, Suggestions and a Collection of Examples of Letterpress Job Printing Arranged for the Assistance of Master Printers, Amateurs, Apprentices, and Others. Cincinnati Press.
- Hartley, James (1980). "Spatial Cues in Text". Visible Language. 14 (1): 62–79.
- Hopper, Vincent F.; Gale, Cedric; Foote, Ronald C.; Griffith, B.W. (2004). A Pocket Guide to Correct Grammar (4th ed.). Barron's Educational Series. 208 pages. ISBN 978-0-7641-2690-1.
- Imprimerie nationale (1993). Lexique des règles typographiques en usage à l'Imprimerie nationale (in French) (3ème édition ed.). Imprimerie nationale.
- Jacobi, Charles Thomas (1890). Some Notes on Books and Printing; a Guide for Authors, Publishers, & Others (New & Enlarged ed.). London: C. Wittingham.
- Jury, David (2004). About Face: Reviving the Rules of Typography. Switzerland: Rotovision SA. 159 pages. ISBN 978-2-88046-798-2.
- Jury, David (2009). "What is Typography?" (PDF). Rotovision. pp. 28–87. Archived from the original (PDF) on 28 September 2011.
- Kolers, Paul A.; Duchinsky, Robert; Ferguson, Dennis C. (1981). "Eye Movement Measurement of Readability of CRT Displays". Human Factors. 23 (5): 517–527. doi:10.1177/001872088102300502. PMID 7319497. S2CID 44651876.
- Korpela, Jukka (3 May 2005). "Guide to the Unicode Standard". Characters and Encodings. IT and Communication17 May 2010.
- Kouguell, Susan (2006). The Savvy Screenwriter: How to Sell Your Screenplay (and Yourself) Without Selling Out! (Revised & Expanded ed.). New York: St. Martin's Griffin. 288 pages. ISBN 978-0-312-35575-3.
- LeClercq, Terri (2007). Guide to Legal Writing Style (Fourth ed.). New York: Aspen Publishers. 144 pages. ISBN 978-0-7355-6837-2.
- Leonard, Kristi; et al. (10 October 2009). "The Effects of Computer-based Text Spacing on Reading Comprehension and Reading Rate". AECT1 February 2010. Archived from the original on 17 July 2011.
- Lesina, Roberto (2009). Il Nuovo Manuale di Stile: Guida alla Redazione di Documenti, Relazioni, Articoli, Manuali, Tesi di Laurea (PDF) (in Italian) (2.0 ed.). Zanichelli.
- Lester, Mark; Beason, Larry (2005). The McGraw Hill Handbook of English Grammar and Usage. New York: McGraw Hill. 304 pages. ISBN 978-0-07-144133-9.
- Lloyd, John Wills; Hallahan, Dan (10 November 2009). "Where's the Evidence to Justify Two Spaces?". Spacewaste. Wordpress.com4 April 2010. Archived from the original on 15 December 2014.
- Loberger, Gordon; Shoup, Kate (2009). Webster's New World English Grammar Handbook (2nd ed.). Hoboken, NJ: Wiley Publishing. 408 pages. ISBN 978-0-470-41080-6.
- Loh, Christian Sebastian; Branch, Robert Maribe; Shewanown, Saun; Ali, Radwan (2002). "The Effect of Text Spacing After the Period on Time for On-Screen Reading Tasks". IVLA Book of Selected Readings: Selected Readings of the IVLA Annual Conference (PDF). IVLA. Archived (PDF) from the original on 29 January 2023.
- Lupton, Ellen (2004). Thinking with Type. New York: Princeton Architectural Press. 176. ISBN 978-1-56898-448-3.
- Lutz, Gary; Stevenson, Diane (2005). The Writing Digest Grammar Desk Reference. Cincinnati, OH: Writer's Digest Books. ISBN 978-1-58297-335-7.
- Lynch, Patrick J.; Horton, Sarah (2008). Web Style Guide. New Haven and London: Yale University Press. 352 pages. ISBN 978-0-300-13737-8.
- MacKellar, Thomas (1885). The American Printer: A Manual of Typography, Containing Practical Directions for Managing all Departments of a Printing Office, As Well as Complete Instructions for Apprentices: With Several Useful Tables, Numerous Schemes for Imposing Forms in Every Variety, Hints to Authors, Etc (Fifteenth – Revised and Enlarged ed.). Philadelphia: MacKellar, Smiths & Jordan. 390 pages.
- Mergenthaler Linotype Company (1940). Linotype Keyboard Operation: Methods of Study and Procedures for Setting Various Kinds of Composition on the Linotype. Brooklyn, N.Y: Mergenthaler Linotype Company. OCLC 3230264.
- Microsoft (2010). "Italian Style Guide: Microsoft Language Excellence". Microsoft Language Portal – Style Guide Download (in Italian) (1.0 ed.). Microsoft. Archived from the original on 15 August 2021.
- Microsoft. "Character design standards (5 of 10): Space Characters for Latin 1". Microsoft Typography. Microsoft. Archived from the original on 3 May 2010.
- Modern Humanities Research Association (2002). MHRA Style Guide: A Handbook for Authors, Editors, and Writers of Theses. Leeds, UK: Maney Publishing. 92 pages. ISBN 978-0-947623-62-3.
- Modern Language Association (15 January 2009). "How many spaces should I leave after a period or other concluding mark of punctuation?". Modern Language Association31 January 2010. Archived from the original on 12 October 2006.
- Modern Language Association (2009). MLA Handbook for Writers of Research Papers (7th ed.). Modern Language Association of America. ISBN 978-1-60329-024-1.
- Ni, Xiaopeng; Branch, Robert Maribe; Chen, Kuan-Chung; Clinton, Gregory (2009). Sleeman, Phillip J (ed.). "The Effects of Text Spacing on Screen Reading Time and Comprehension" (PDF). International Journal of Instructional Media. 36 (4).
- North, A. J.; Jenkins, L. B. (1951). "Reading Speed and Comprehension as a Function of Typography". Journal of Applied Psychology. 35 (4): 225–228. doi:10.1037/h0063094. PMID 14861125.
- Osgood, Harry W. (1919). "A Method for Teaching Straight Matter Composition". Industrial-arts Magazine. 8 (2): 47–48.
- Payne, Donald R. (1967). "Readability of Typewritten Material; Proportional Versus Standard Spacing". The Journal of Typographic Research. 1 (2): 125–136.
- "The Canadian Style Online". Public Works and Government Services of Canada, The Translation Bureau, The Government of Canada's terminology and linguistic data bank TERMIUM-Plus. 2010. Archived from the original on 22 September 2015.
- Publications Office of the European Union (24 July 2008). "Interinstitutional Style Guide". Europa. European Union12 May 2010. Archived from the original on 16 February 2017.
- Real Academia Española (2001). "Diccionario de la Lengua Española de la Real Academia Española". Real Academia Española. Archived from the original on 10 November 2015.
- Rhodes, John S. (13 April 1999). "One Versus Two Spaces After a Period". Webword.com21 March 2010. Archived from the original on 9 March 2010.
- Ritter, R. M., ed. (2003). Oxford Style Manual. Oxford: Oxford University Press. 1033 pages. ISBN 978-0-19-860564-5.
- Rollo, Lindsay (1993). "Words and Images in Print and on Screen" (PDF). SET: Research Information for Teachers. Archived from the original (PDF) on 22 May 2010.
- Rosendorf, Theodore (2009). The Typographic Desk Reference (1st ed.). New Castle, Delaware: Oak Knoll. 152 pages. ISBN 978-1-58456-231-3.
- Rosendorf, Theodore (2010). "The Double Space Debate". Type Desk. Archived from the original on 11 February 2010.
- Rusch, Kristine Kathryn; Smith, Dean Wesley (1990). Science Fiction Writers of America Handbook (1990 ed.). Writers Notebook Press.
- Russin, Robin U.; Downs, William M. (2003). Screenplay, Writing the Picture. Silman-James Press. 483 pages. ISBN 978-1-879505-70-4.
- Ryder, John (1979). The Case for Legibility. London: Bodley Head. ISBN 978-0-370-30158-7.
- Sabin, William (1985). The Gregg Reference Manual (6th ed.). New York: McGraw-Hill. ISBN 978-0-07-054399-7.
- Sabin, William (2005). The Gregg Reference Manual (10th Spiral-bound ed.). New York: McGraw-Hill. 688 pages. ISBN 978-0-07-293653-7.
- Sambuchino, Chuck; The Editors of Writer's Digest Books (2009). Formatting and Submitting your Manuscript (3rd ed.). Cincinnati, OH: Writer's Digest Books. 324. ISBN 978-1-58297-571-9.
- Scales, Alice Y. (2002). "Improving Instructional Materials by Improving Document Formatting" (PDF). ASEE Southeast Section Conference. Archived from the original (PDF) on 1 March 2012.
- Schriver, Karen A. (1997). Dynamics in Document Design. New York, Chichester, Brisbane, Toronto, Singapore, Weinheim: John Wiley & Sons. 592 pages. ISBN 978-0-471-30636-8.
- Sheerin, Peter K. (19 October 2001). "The Trouble With EM 'n EN (and Other Shady Characters)". A List Apart. A List Apart Magazine17 May 2010. Archived from the original on 15 January 2013.
- Shushan, Ronnie; Wright, Don (1989). Desktop Publishing by Design. Redmond, WA: Microsoft Press. ISBN 978-1-55615-134-7.
- Smith, Laurie (8 July 2009). "Don't Date Yourself by Using Two Spaces after a Period in Your Resume!". Executive Resumes and Career Transition Strategies: Reflections of an Executive Resume Writer. Creative Keystrokes Executive Resume Service30 March 2010. Archived from the original on 10 July 2011.
- Spiekermann, Erik; Ginger, E.M. (1993). Stop Stealing Sheep & Find Out How Type Works. Mountain View, CA: Adobe Press. ISBN 978-0-672-48543-5.
- Squire, Victoria; Willberg, Hans Peter; Forsmann, Friedrich (2006). Getting it Right with Type. London: Laurence King Publishing. 176 pages. ISBN 978-1-85669-474-2.
- Stevenson, Jay (2005). The Pocket Idiot's Guide to Grammar and Punctuation: A Handy Reference to Resolve All Your Grammatical Problems. Alpha Books. 208 pages. ISBN 978-1-59257-393-6.
- Straus, Jane (2009). The Blue Book of Grammar and Punctuation: An Easy-to-Use Guide with Clear Rules, Real-World Examples, and Reproducible Quizzes (10th ed.). San Francisco, CA: Jossey-Bass. 176 pages. ISBN 978-0-470-22268-3.
- Strizver, Ilene. "Double Spaces Between Sentences ... Not!". U&lc: Upper and Lowercase Magazine Online: Issue 41.1.1. International Typeface Organization and Monotype Imaging. Archived from the original on 10 March 2010.
- Strizver, Ilene (2010). Type Rules: The Designer's Guide to Professional Typography (3rd ed.). New Jersey: John Wiley & Sons. ISBN 978-0-470-54251-4.
- Strumpf, Michael; Douglas, Auriel (2004). The Grammar Bible. New York: Holt Paperbacks. 512. ISBN 978-0-8050-7560-1.
- Strunk, William; White, E.B. (2008). The Elements of Style (50th Anniversary ed.). Longman. 128. ISBN 978-0-205-63264-0.
- Style Manual Committee (2006). Scientific Style and Format: The CSE Manual for Authors, Editors, and Publishers (7 ed.). Reston, VA: Council of Science Editors. 658 pages. ISBN 978-0-9779665-0-9.
- Taggart, Caroline (2009). My Grammar and I: Or Should that be "Me"?. London: JA Wines. ISBN 978-1-60652-026-0.
- Tinker, Miles A. (1963). Legibility of Print. Iowa: Iowa State University Press. ISBN 978-0-8138-2450-5.
- Tinker, Miles A. (Summer 1966). "Experimental Studies on the Legibility of Print: An Annotated Bibliography". Reading Research Quarterly. 1 (4): 67–118. JSTOR 747222.
- Trottier, David (2005). The Screenwriter's Bible: A Complete Guide to Writing, Formatting, and Selling Your Script (4th ed.). Los Angeles: Silman James Press. ISBN 978-1-879505-84-1.
- Truss, Lynn (2004). Eats, Shoots & Leaves: The Zero Tolerance Approach to Punctuation. New York: Gotham Books. p. 25. ISBN 978-1-59240-087-4.
- Turabian, Kate L. (2007). Booth, Wayne C.; Colomb, Gregory G.; Williams, Joseph M. (eds.). A Manual for Writers of Research Papers, Theses, and Dissertations (7th ed.). Chicago: University of Chicago Press. ISBN 978-0-226-82337-9.
- Unicode (2009). "Unicode Standard Annex #14: Unicode Line Breaking Algorithm". Unicode Technical Reports. Unicode. Archived from the original on 29 April 2010.
- United States. (16 September 2008). "U.S. Government Printing Office Style Manual". Archived from the original on 31 August 2008.
- "U.S. Navy Style Guide "Punctuation"". United States Navy. Archived from the original on 24 November 2004.
- University of Chicago Press (1911). Manual of Style: A Compilation of Typographical Rules Governing the Publications of the University of Chicago, with Specimens of Types Used at the University Press (Third ed.). Chicago: University of Chicago.
- University of Chicago Press (1969). The Chicago Manual of Style: For Authors, Editors, and Copywriters (12th Revised ed.). Chicago and London: University of Chicago Press. ISBN 978-0-226-77008-6. "Library of Congress Catalog Card Number: 6-40582"
- University of Chicago Press (2003). The Chicago Manual of Style: The Essential Guide for Writers, Editors, and Publishers (15th ed.). Chicago and London: University of Chicago Press. ISBN 978-0-226-10403-4.
- "One Space or Two?". Chicago Manual of Style Online. University of Chicago Press. 2007. 984 pages. Archived from the original on 14 July 2012.
- University of Chicago Press (2010). The Chicago Manual of Style: The Essential Guide for Writers, Editors, and Publishers (16th ed.). Chicago and London: University of Chicago Press. ISBN 978-0-226-10420-1.
- Walsh, Bill (2004). The Elephants of Style: A Trunkload of Tips on the Big Issues and Gray Areas of Contemporary American English. New York: McGraw Hill. 238 pages. ISBN 978-0-07-142268-0.
- W3C (24 December 1999). "9.1 White Space". HTML 4.01 Coding Specification. W3C17 May 2010. Archived from the original on 23 June 2019.
- W3C (24 December 1999). "24.4 Character Entity References for Markup-Significant and Internationalization characters". HTML 4.01 Coding Specification. W3C17 May 2010. Archived from the original on 23 June 2019.
- Weiderkehr, Sarah (30 July 2009). "On Two Spaces Following a Period". American Psychological Association29 January 2010. Archived from the original on 14 September 2015.
- Wershler-Henry, Darren (2005). The Iron Whim: A Fragmented History of Typewriting. Ithaca and London: Cornell University Press. ISBN 978-0-8014-4586-6.
- Wheildon, Colin (1995). Type and Layout: How Typography and Design Can Get your Message Across – Or Get in the Way. Berkeley: Strathmoor Press. 248 pages. ISBN 978-0-9624891-5-0.
- Wide Spacer (2014). "One or two spaces after a period? How about three?". Wide Spacer blog. Archived from the original on 22 March 2014.
- Wiley, John, & Sons Australia (2007). Style Manual: For Authors, Editors and Printers (6th ed.). John Wiley & Sons Australia. ISBN 978-0-7016-3648-7.
- Williams, Robin (1995). The PC is Not a Typewriter (1st ed.). Berkeley, CA: Peachpit Press. 96. ISBN 978-0-938151-49-4.
- Williams, Robin (July–August 1995). "Thirteen Telltale Signs" (PDF). Adobe Magazine. Adobe. Archived from the original (PDF) on 3 December 2010.
- Williams, Robin (2003). The Mac is Not a Typewriter: A Style Manual for Creating Professional-level Type on Your Macintosh (2nd ed.). Berkeley, CA: Peachpit Press. 96 pages. ISBN 978-0-201-78263-9.
