= Legibility =

Ease with which a reader can decode symbols

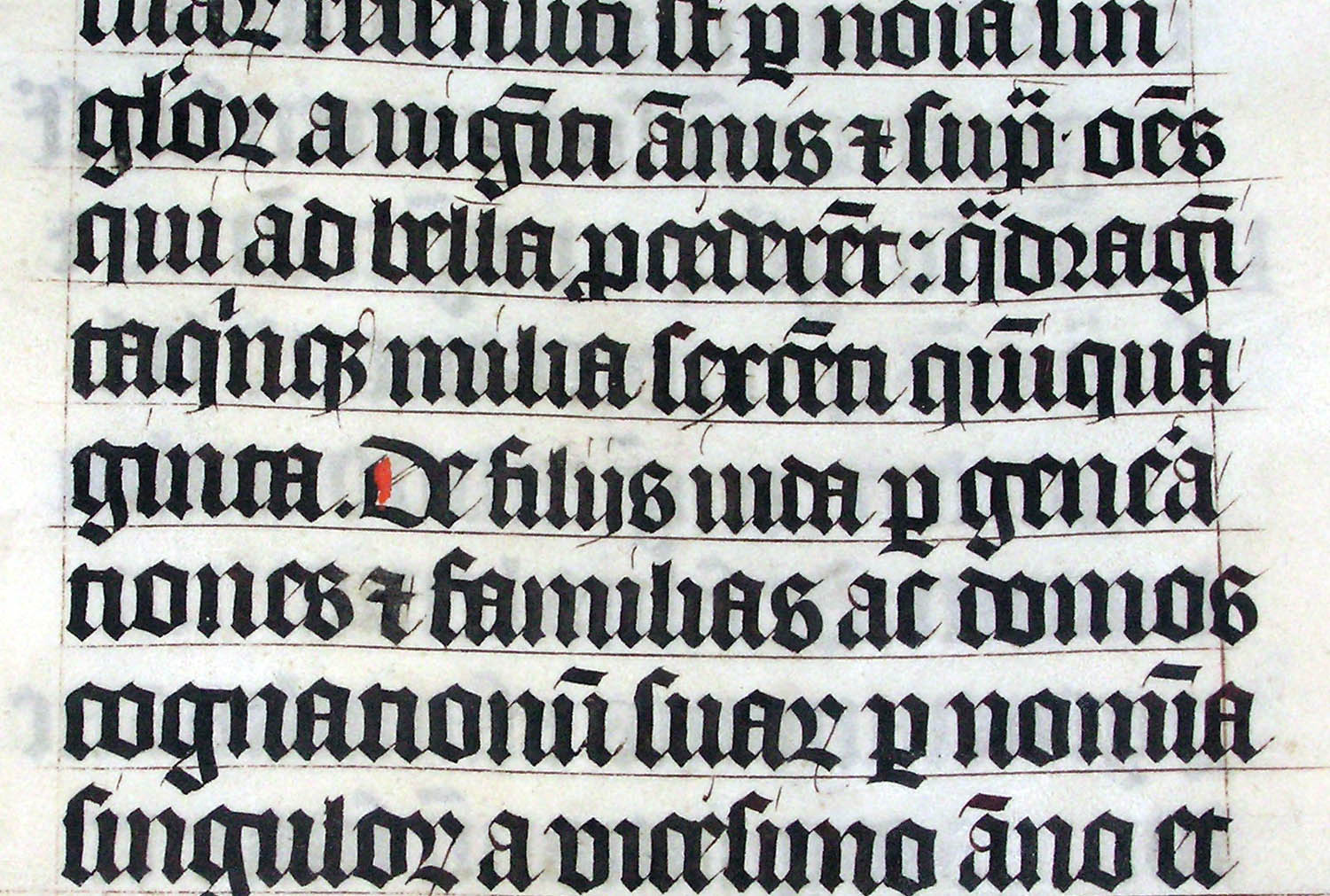
Vulgate manuscript: Book of Numbers 1:24-26

Legibility is the ease with which a reader can decode symbols. In addition to written language, it can also refer to behaviour or architecture, for example. From the perspective of communication research, it can be described as a measure of the permeability of a communication channel. A large number of known factors can affect legibility.

In everyday language, legibility is commonly used as a synonym for readability. In graphic design, however, legibility is often distinguished from readability. Readability is the ease with which a reader can follow and understand words, sentences and paragraphs. While legibility usually refers to the visual clarity of individual symbols, readability is more about their arrangement or even the choice of words. Legibility is a component of readability.

The legibility of text is most often examined by controlled deterioration of viewing conditions and determination of threshold detection.

Not all writing benefits from optimizing for legibility. Texts that are supposed to be eye-catching or whose appearance is supposed to hold certain connotations could deliberately deviate from easy legibility for these purposes. Corresponding typefaces are called display typefaces.

== Influencing factors ==
The legibility of visual displays (e.g. text) depends on:

- environmental conditions or interferences, such as lighting or vibrations (e.g. from walking), which affect the human visual system
- the viewing distance (i.e. the angular size of the symbols)
- the font design
- the reproduction quality (e.g. sufficient brightness contrast between symbols and their background), which may be limited by the technology of the presentation medium
- abilities and fitness of the readers

While a difference in viewing distance equally affects the angular size of symbols and their optical resolution, the former has a much greater effect on legibility.

A few decades ago, screens were less legible than print on paper, but this is no longer true with newer screens.

It has been shown that threshold legibility performance correlates inversely with the age of the readers. Older readers are disproportionately affected by other adverse factors in visual design, such as small text size.

=== Typography ===
"The legibility of a typeface is related to the characteristics inherent in its design … which relate to the ability to distinguish one letter from the other." Aspects of type design that affect legibility include "x-height, character shapes, stroke contrast, the size of its counters, serifs or lack thereof, and weight." Other typographic factors that affect legibility include font choice, angular size (point size vs. viewing distance), kerning, cases used, tracking, line length, leading, and justification.

While readers may like or dislike fonts based on the familiarity of their appearance, they nevertheless achieve a comparable reading performance after a short period of familiarization with a new typeface, provided that the glyphs are equally clear and exhibit the essential features of the represented letter.

Reducing the stroke width below a certain point impairs legibility. Italic type is read more slowly.

At the same point size, capital letters are easier to read in Latin script; but this is reversed if the cap height of the capitals is adjusted to the x-height of the lowercase letters (in which case the lower case letters take up more space due to their ascenders and descenders.)

The relative legibility of words in uppercase vs. words in lowercase has long been debated.

Despite contrary opinions, serifs have little observable influence on reading speed. At low resolution, the additional spacing between letters required for the serifs seems to improve legibility, whereas otherwise they have a slightly adverse effect. For special groups, the picture may look different: some people within the dyslexic community seems to be convinced that serifs are unnecessary visual clutter, which makes the text less accessible and makes the letter shapes deviate more from the simpler forms known from school. However this has been disproven for the majority of dyslexic readers in studies by organisations like The Readability Group, and another study found serifs to be detrimental for reading speed at low resolution. Meanwhile for readers with impaired vision, Ann Bessemans conducted a study of children with normal or impaired vision, testing which genre of typefaces work best for them, and created Matilda which is said to be:

"designed that is able to provide support for the target group of visually impaired children in the first stages of the reading process. Matilda should be seen as a tool for supporting reading, not as the solution to reading problems."

Eye tracker studies support the theory that increasing complexity of shapes reduces legibility. The addition of vowel marks in Arabic script has contradictory effects, but appears to be detrimental to legibility overall. Freestanding letters are easier to recognize than ones with adjacent elements; this is known as crowding effect.

Common measures to improve legibility at lowest resolution include the use of wide apertures/large open counters, large x-height, low stroke variability, big features, etc., while some improvements like ink traps are specific to different presentation media. The positive effect of more open apertures could be experimentally confirmed for the opening of the lowercase e, but not for the larger opening of the lowercase c. Narrow letter shapes such as f, j, l and i usually benefit from larger tails that widen their shape, except for the lowercase f.

==== Dyslexics and learners ====
While a large x-height is generally considered helpful for legibility at low resolutions, however a minority within the dyslexic community hold the theory that short ascenders/descenders tend to cause confusion. Dyslexics and learners also seem to prefer less regularity between individual letterforms, especially further differentiating features in glyphs that are often just mirrored versions of other letters, as in the group b, d, p and q, since the human brain seems to have evolved to recognize (symmetrical) three-dimensional objects regardless of their orientation in space. This is the basis for some of the most devout endorsements of the otherwise much hated Comic Sans typeface. Other important aspects seem to be the familiarity of the glyph shapes, the absence of serifs and looser spacing. While textbook versions perform better with inexperienced readers/learners, most experienced readers seem to be more comfortable with the traditional two-story print forms for a and g.

== See also ==
- Measure (typography) – In typography, width of a block of typeset text
- Optical character recognition (OCR)
- Despeckle – Process of removing noise from a signal; in written material, removing visual clutter
