= Miles Tinker =

American author

Miles Albert Tinker (August 22, 1893 – March 4, 1977) was an American author. He is "an internationally recognized authority on legibility of print" who published the results of some of the most comprehensive studies on the legibility of print ever conducted. According to Jeremy York, Tinker's work, along with his colleague Donald G. Paterson, "was a driving force behind the standardization of the print industry in the United States".

Tinker conducted studies on the effect of typography on reading at the University of Minnesota for 32 years. "Much of what is known—rather than intuitively felt—about type legibility is derived from Tinker’s work." He published prolifically in various journals during this period. Tinker also authored or co-authored seven books. Legibility of Print, published in 1963, summarized the results of his studies in 1927–1959 and is the "seminal study on how we read printed type".

Tinker was also a critic. In reviewing a book by Wolfe et al., Improving Undergraduate Instruction in Psychology he suggested that the book is more geared towards psychologists than students of psychology He added that the authors' book was "inadequate" and the title "misleading" since they did not provide methods in improving undergraduate instructions; it was more about the programs that are offered in psychology and course information.

== Background ==
Miles Tinker was born in Huntington, Massachusetts. He was trained at top institutions of his time (Stanford, Clark U.) with some of the most famous foundational psychologists of his time including Lewis Terman, E.C. Sanford, and Walter Miles, earning his "B.A. and M.A. degrees from Clark University and the Ph.D. degree from Stanford University".

Miles Tinker was a professor emeritus at the University of Minnesota in 1927–1959. He "conducted one of the most extensive inquiries into the effects of typological factors ever conducted". His work focused on studies of typographic variables, seeking "variations in reader function as a response to typography." "His work was systemic, methodological, and consistent." The results of his studies provide not only "a model for modern investigators into parameters of type," but also allows modern practitioners "to make choices as to typography with reliability as to reading efficiency".

Most of Tinker's work was published in psychological journals. Because these journals were not typically read by members of the printing industry, much of his work was not well known during his lifetime.

Tinker served "as consultant for a number of groups in both government and industry." As of 1963, he was a consulting psychologist in Santa Barbara, California.

A compendium of Tinker's work can be found in Miles Albert Tinker and the Zone of Optimal Typography, by Sutherland, Sandra Wright (1989), Unpublished doctoral dissertation, University of Washington. This work has been updated with minor changes in 2018 and placed in the public domain (Amazon) for education and extended understanding of Tinker's lifetime of research, not only on typography, but also in psychology, illumination, eye movements, and reading. In fact, Tinker's work did not as much define typography for printers as it standardized such variables for non-printers to learn and understand. The result is a "chicken or the egg?" type discovery. Did Tinker's work support best practices of the printing industry or did it demonstrate the effects of many years of practice in training the eyes of millions of readers? Certain biological effects of visual perception are discussed in Sutherland's work. It is also suggested that Tinker's work would ably serve as a starting point for those who were interested in the effects of transmitted light of today's computers and how the wide variations possible effect reading and even attention on today's technological devices of all kinds. This could keep a researcher busy for another 30 years.

== Research ==
Tinker studied the relationship between speed of reading and visual presentation. He observed many groups of undergraduate students who were administered tests which had time constraints. The subjects who did the tests in double the time did better than those who were given less time and had to do the test at a faster and pressured rate. When the students were given unlimited time, the test results were equivalent to the scores with the results from the time doubled. This study suggested to maximize performance, ample time should be given to complete all tasks. It is unnecessary to extend time beyond that as the results will only be similar. A significant factor in the effectiveness of Tinker's testing was the requirement of a processing of information in the variable text displays which forced the reader to process as well as perceive and respond over time. Comprehension was an integral part of the test design, so that readers could not read any faster than their processing of the visual information within the text would allow. Dr Donald Paterson was invaluable in adding statistical expertise to pursue the maximum reliability of analysis.

Tinker also studied the best possible ways to teach reading in his book "Teaching Elementary Reading". In this book he addresses the principles and practises to be an effective reading instructor. He emphasises the following aspects of reading, reading readiness, word recognition, vocabulary, comprehension, individual differences, and remedial reading interests, and appraisal. This book is very beneficial to elementary school teachers.

== Awards and memberships ==
=== Memberships ===
- Fellow of the American Psychological Association
- Fellow in Distinguished Service Foundation of Optometry

=== Awards ===
- Citation of Merit from the International Reading Association

== Study areas ==
One of Tinker's notable contribution in research is a study on the effect of typography of eye movements. The study revealed that poor typography lead to more frequent fixations, and longer pauses. As a result, the overall reading speed was slowed. Another study concerning typography suggested that font size 6 and 14 slowed readers down. His study on Illumination suggested that brighter lights in the work area than the surrounding causes eye fatigue; instead, 25 foot candles would have been sufficient. The following are Tinker's "factors studied".

1928. Type form (lower case vs. all caps vs. italics).
1929. Size of type (6pt., 8pt., 10pt., 12pt., 14pt.).
1929. Length of line (9, 13, 17, 21, 25, 29, 33, 37 picas).
1931. Simultaneous variation of type size and line length.
1931. Black type vs. white type.
1931. Variations in color of print and background.
1932. Leading, or interline spacing (set solid, 1 pt., 2 pt., 4 pt.).
1932. Styles of type face (Scotch Roman, Garamond, Antique, Bodoni, Old Style, Caslon, Kabel Lite, Cheltenham, American Typewriter, Cloister Black).
1936. Printing surface (Eggshell, Artisan enamel, Flint enamel).

=== Other typographical studies ===
1928. Numerals vs. words.
1928. Relative legibility of letters, digits, and mathematical signs.
1930. Relative legibility of Modern and Old Style numerals.
1932. Color of print and background.
1938. Part-whole proportion illusion in printing.
1942. Reader preference and typography.
1943. Comic books.
1944. Criteria for readability.
1946. Yearbook photography.

=== Newspaper typography ===
1943. Newspaper body types.
1944. Wartime changes in newspaper body types.
1946. Newspaper headlines (upper vs. lower case).
1946. Newspaper and book print.
1947. Newspaper type (leading).
1963. Simultaneous variation in size of type, width of line and leading for newspaper type.

=== Children's needs ===
1935. Typography for children.
1953. Size of type in primary grades.
1959. Print for children's textbooks.
1963. Legibility of print for children in the upper grades.

=== Miscellaneous ===
1948. Marginal conditions.
1948. Blink rate (book print and newsprint).
1949. Nine point type and line width and leading.
1953. Vibration effects with six point type.
1954. Slanted text.
1955. Vertical vs. horizontal arrangements.
1955. Typographical variations.
1956. Angular alignment.
1956. Sloped text.
1975. Curved text.

=== Eye movements, influence of ===
1939, Type form.
1940. Line width.
1941. Modern type face and Old English.
1942. Size of type.
1942. Line width for six point type.
1944. Optimal and non-optimal typography.
1944. Black print on white, red on dark green.
1955. Vertical and horizontal arrangements.
1955. Typographical variations.
1957. Color of print and background.

=== Illumination, for reading ===
1943. Newspaper type.
1952. Six point type.

== Publications ==
Research from Tinker's studies has "provided material for nearly 200 publications, including seven books." "Over half of Tinker's studies involving typography were co-authored by Donald Paterson, whose interests were aligned with those of present day instructional technologists." Tinker's most important book was Legibility of Print, which summarized much of the research he conducted during his 32 years at the University of Minnesota. It is "the seminal study on how we read printed type, and it remains the standard for typography even now," decades after it was published.

=== Books ===
1938. Introduction to Methods in Experimental Psychology. (Miles Tinker and Kenneth H. Baker Tinker)
1940. How to Make Type Readable
1961. Teaching Elementary Reading. (Miles Tinker and Constance M. McCullough)
1963. Legibility of Print
1965. Bases for Effective Reading
1967. Reading Difficulties: Their Diagnosis and Correction. (Guy L. Bond and Miles Tinker)
1976. Preparing Your Child for Reading.

=== Journal articles ===
1926. Reading reactions for mathematical formulae. Journal of Experimental Psychology, Vol. 9.
1927. Legibility and eye movements in reading. Psychological Bulletin, Vol. 24.
1928. Influence of type form on speed of reading. Journal of Applied Psychology, Vol. 12. (Donald G. Paterson as co-author.)
1928. The relative legibility of the letters, the digits, and of certain mathematical signs. Journal of General Psychology, Vol. 1.
1928. Numerals versus words for efficiency in reading. Journal of Applied Psychology, Vol. 12.
1928. A photographic study of eye movements in reading formulae. Genetic Psychology Monographs, Vol. 3.
1928. How formulae are read. American Journal of Psychology, Vol. 40.
1929. Studies of typographical factors influencing speed of reading: III. Length of line. Journal of Applied Psychology, Vol. 13. (Donald G. Paterson as co-author.)
1929. Studies of typographical factors influencing speed of reading: II. Size of type. Journal of Applied Psychology, Vol. 13. (Tinker as co-author for D. G. Paterson.)
1930. Time-limit vs. work-limit methods. American Journal of Psychology, Vol. 42. (Donald G. Paterson as co-author.)
1930. Studies of typographical factors influencing speed of reading: IV. Effect of practice on equivalence of test forms. Journal of Applied Psychology, Vol. 14. (Donald G. Paterson as co-author.)
1930. The relative legibility of modern and old style numerals. Journal of Experimental Psychology, Vol. 13.
1931. Studies of typographical factors influencing speed of reading: VI. Black type versus white type. Journal of Applied Psychology, Vol. 15. (Tinker as co-author for D. G. Paterson.)
1931. Studies of typographical factors influencing speed of reading: V. Simultaneous variation of type size and line length. Journal of Applied Psychology, Vol. 15. (Donald G. Paterson as co-author.)
1931. Studies of typographical factors influencing speed of reading: VII. Variations in color of print and background. Journal of Applied Psychology, Vol. 15. (Donald G. Paterson as co-author.)
1931. Apparatus for recording eye movements. American Journal of Psychology, Vol. 43.
1931. A. Physiological psychology of reading. Psychological Bulletin, Vol. 28.
1932. Studies of typographical factors influencing speed of reading: X. Style of type face. Journal of Applied Psychology, Vol. 16. (Tinker as co-author for D. G. Paterson.)
1932. The influence of form of type on the perception of words. Journal of Applied Psychology, Vol. 16.
1932. Studies of typographical factors influencing speed of reading: VIII. Space between lines or leading. Journal of Applied Psychology, Vol. 16. (Tinker as co-author for D. G. Paterson.)
1932. Studies of typographicalf actors influencing speed of reading: IX. Reduction of size of newspaper print. Journal of Applied Psychology, Vol. 16. (Donald G. Paterson as co-author.)
1932. The effect of luminosity on the apprehension of acromatic stimuli. Journal of General Psychology, Vol. 6. (Tinker as co-author to Corneliad Taylor.)
1932. The effect of color on visual apprehension and perception. Genetic Psychology Monographs, Vol. 11.
1934. Evaluation of photographic measures of reading, Journal of Educational Psychology, Vol. 25. (A. Frandsen as co-author.)
1934. Experimental study of reading. Psychological Bulletin, Vol. 31.
1935. Studies of typographical factors influencing speed of reading: XI. Role of set in typographical studies. Journal of Applied Psychology, Vol. 19. (Donald G. Paterson as co-author.)
1935. The influence of paper surface on the perceptibility of print. Journal of Applied Psychology, Vol. 19. (Tinker as co-author to Helen A. Webster.)
1936. Reliability and validity of eye-movement measures of reading. Journal of Experimental Psychology, Vol. 19.
1936. Eye movements, perception, and legibility in reading. Psychological Bulletin, Vol. 33.
1936. Eye movements in reading. Journal of Educational Research, Vol. 30.
1936. Studies of typographical factors influencing speed of reading: XII. Printing surface. Journal of Applied Psychology, Vol. 20. (Tinker as co-author to Paterson.)
1936. Studies of typographical factors influencing speed of reading: XIII. Methodological considerations. Journal of Applied Psychology, Vol. 20. (D. Paterson as co-author.)
1938. The part-whole proportion illusion in printing. Journal of Applied Psychology, Vol. 22. (Tinker as co-author.)
1939. The effect of illumination intensities upon speed of perception and upon fatigue in reading. Journal of Educational Psychology, Vol. 30.
1939. Illumination standards for effective and comfortable vision. Journal of Consulting Psychology, Vol. 3 (1).
1939. Influence of type form on eye movements. Journal of Experimental Psychology, Vol. 25. (Donald G. Paterson as co-author.)
1940. Influence of line width on eye movements. Journal of Experimental Psychology, Vol. 27. (Tinker as co-author for D. G. Paterson.)
1941. Effect of visual adaptation upon intensity of light preferred for reading. American Journal of Psychology, Vol. 54.
1941. Eye movements in reading a modern type face and Old English. American Journal of Psychology, Vol. 54. (Donald G. Paterson as co-author.)
1942. The effect of adaptation upon visual efficiency in illumination studies. American Journal of Optometry and Archives of American Academy of Optometry, Vol. 19.
1942. Influence of size of type on eye movements. Journal of Applied Psychology, Vol. 26. (Tinker as co-author for D. G. Paterson.)
1942. Reader preferences and typography. Journal of Applied Psychology, Vol. 26. (Donald G. Paterson as co-author.)
1942. Influence of line width on eye movements for six point type. Journal of Educational Psychology, Vol. 33. (Tinker as co-author for D. G. Paterson.)
1943. Readability of comic books. American Journal of Optometry and Archives of American Academy of Optometry, Vol. 20.
1943. Differences among newspaper body types in readability. Journalism Quarterly, Vol. 20. (Donald G. Paterson as co-author to Tinker.)
1943. Illumination intensities for reading newspaper type. Journal of Educational Psychology, Vol. 34.
1943. Eye movements in reading type sizes in optimal line widths. Journal of Educational Psychology, Vol. 34. (Tinker as co-author for D. G. Paterson.)
1944. Criteria for determining the readability of typefaces. Journal of Educational Psychology, Vol. 35.
1944. Eye movements in reading optimal and non-optimal typography. Journal of Experimental Psychology, Vol. 34. (Tinker as co-author for D. G. Paterson.)
1944. Wartime changes in newspaper body type. Journalism Quarterly, Vol. 21. (Donald G. Paterson as co-author.)
1944. Eye movements in reading black print on white background and red print on dark green background. American Journal of Psychology, Vol. 57. (Donald G. Paterson as co-author.)
1945. Effect of visual adaptation upon intensity of illumination preferred for reading with direct lighting. Journal of Applied Psychology, Vol. 29.
1945. Reliability of blinking frequency employed as a measure of readability. Journal of Experimental Psychology, Vol. 35.
1946. Readability of newspaper headlines printed in capitals and lower case. Journal of Applied Psychology, Vol. 30. (Tinker as co-author to Paterson.)
1946. The relative readability of newsprint and book print. Journal of Applied Psychology, Vol. 30. (Tinker as co-author to Paterson.)
1946. Effect of line width and leading on readability of newspaper type. Journalism Quarterly, Vol. 23. (Donald G. Paterson as co-author.)
1946. A study of eye movements in reading. Psychological Bulletin, Vol. 43.
1946. Validity of frequency of blinking as a criterion of readability. Journal of Experimental Psychology, Vol. 36.
1946. Readability of mixed type forms. Journal of Applied Psychology, Vol. 30. (Donald G. Paterson as co-author.)
1947. Time relations for eye-movement measures in reading. Journal of Educational Psychology, Vol. 38.
1947. Influence of leading upon the readability of newspaper type. Journal of Applied Psychology, Vol. 31.
1947. The effect of typography upon the perceptual span in reading. American Journal of Psychology, Vol. 60. (Tinker as co-author for D. G. Paterson.)
1948. Effect of vibration upon reading. American Journal of Psychology, Vol. 61.
1948. Readability of book print and newsprint in terms of blink rate. Journal of Educational Psychology, Vol. 39.
1948. Cumulative effect of marginal conditions upon rate of perception in reading. Journal of Applied Psychology, Vol. 32.
1949. Speed of reading nine point type in relation to line width and leading. Journal of Applied Psychology, Vol. 33. (Donald G. Paterson as co-author.)
1949. Involuntary blink rate and illumination intensity in visual work. Journal of Experimental Psychology, Vol. 39.
1950. Reliability and validity of involuntary blinking as a measure of ease of seeing. Journal of Educational Psychology, Vol. 41.
1950. Typography and legibility in reading. Handbook of Applied Psychology, New York: Holt, Rinehart and Winston, Vol. Pp. 55 (Donald G. Paterson as co-author.)
1951. Derived illumination specifications. Journal of Applied Psychology, Vol. 35.
1951. Fixation pause duration in reading. Journal of Educational Research, Vol. 44.
1952. Interpretation of illumination data. American Journal of Optometry and Archives of American Academy of Optometry, Vol. 29.
1952. The effect of intensity of illumination upon speed of reading six point italic type. American Journal of Psychology, Vol. 65.
1953. Effect of vibration upon speed of perception while reading six point print. Journal of Educational Research, Vol. 46.
1955. The effect of typographical variations upon eye movements in reading. Journal of Educational Research, Vol. 49. (Donald G. Paterson as co-author.)
1954. Effect of a slanted text upon the readability of print. Journal of Educational Psychology, Vol. 45.
1954. Readability of mathematical tables. Journal of Applied Psychology, Vol. 38.
1955. Prolonged reading tasks in visual research. Journal of Applied Psychology, Vol. 39.
1955. Perceptual and oculomotor efficiency in reading materials in vertical and horizontal arrangements. American Journal of Psychology, Vol. 68.
1956. Effect of sloped text upon the readability of print. American Journal of Optometry and Archives of American Academy of Optometry, Vol. 33.
1956. Effect of angular alignment upon readability of print. Journal of Educational Psychology, Vol. 47.
1957. Effect of curved text upon readability of print. Journal of Applied Psychology, Vol. 41.
1957. Effect of variations in color of print and background upon eye movements in reading. American Journal of Optometry and Archives of American Academy of Optometry, Vol. 34. (Tinker as co-author to R. B. Hackman.)
1958. Recent studies of eye movements in reading. Psychological Bulletin, Vol. 54.
1959. Print for children's textbooks. Education, Vol. 80 (1).
1959. Brightness contrast, illumination, and visual efficiency. American Journal of Optometry and Archives of American Academy of Optometry, Vol. 36.
1958. Length of work periods in visual research. Journal of Applied Psychology, Vol. 42.
1960. Legibility of mathematical tables. Journal of Applied Psychology, Vol. 44.
1963. Influence of simultaneous variation in size of type, width of line and leading for newspaper type. Journal of Applied Psychology, Vol. 47.
1963. Legibility of print for children in the upper grades. American Journal of Optometry and Archives of American Academy of Optometry, Vol. 40.
