= Characters per line =

Number of monospaced characters

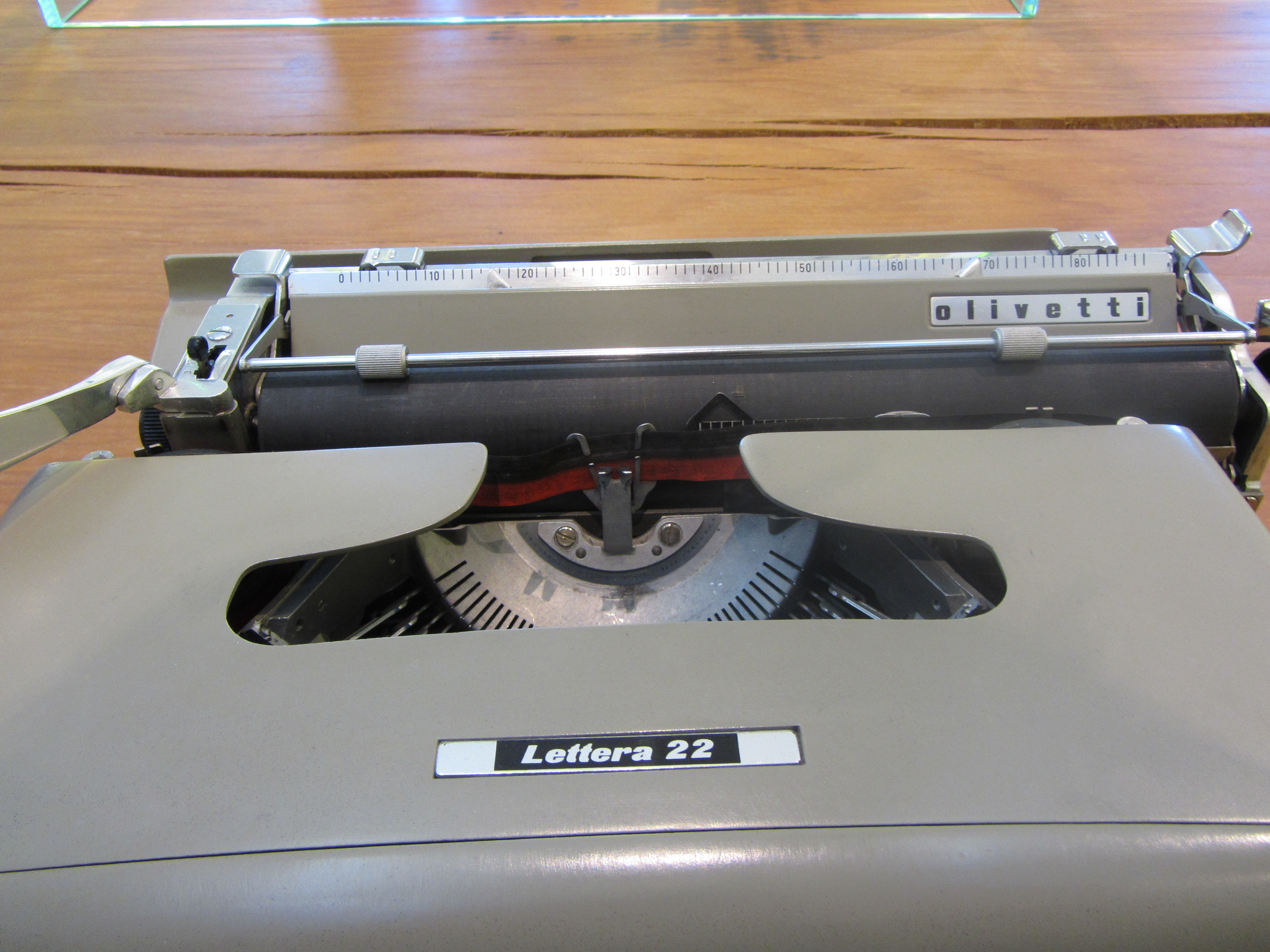
The ruler on the carriage of an Olivetti Lettera 22. This typewriter can print only 87 characters in a line

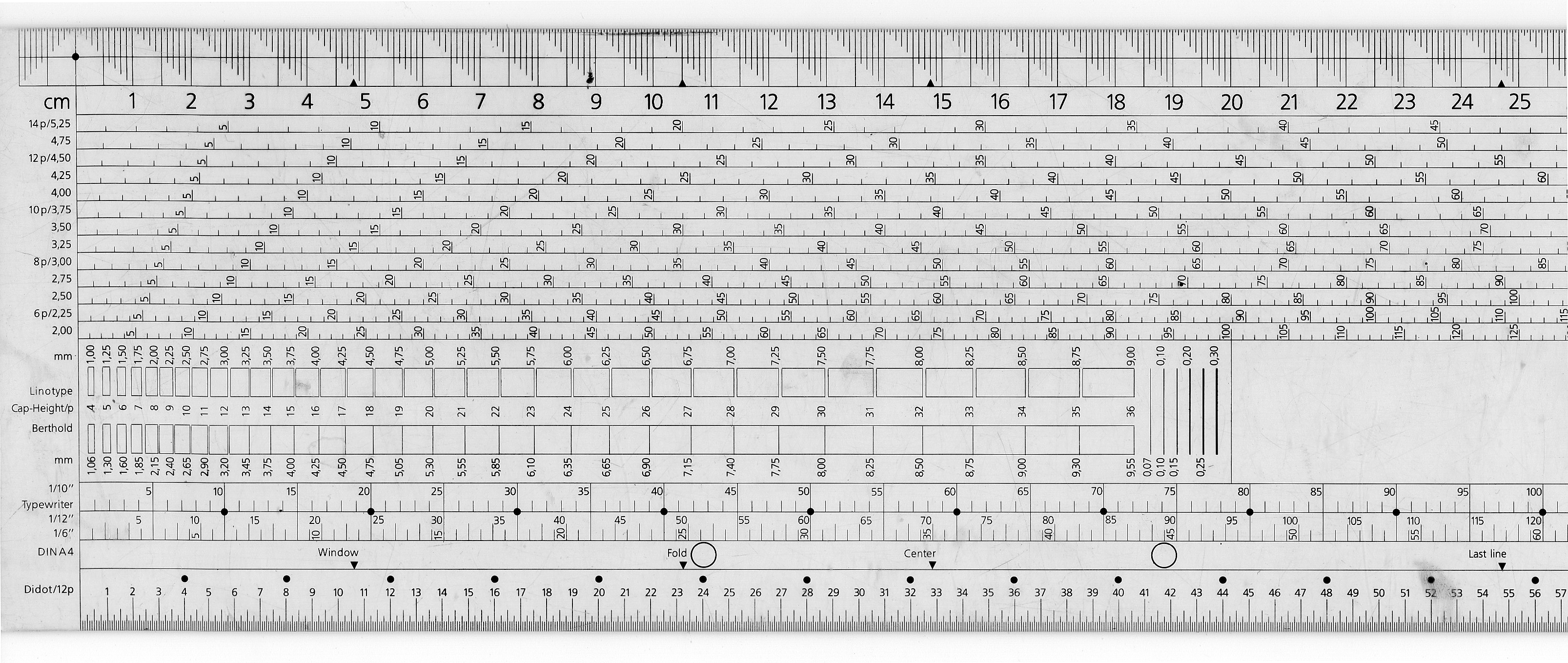
Typometer with the characters per line scales

A Fortran coding form (paper). Source code has 72 CPL, but a form is 80-characters wide. Last 8 positions are "identification sequence"

In typography and computing, characters per line (CPL) or terminal width is the maximal number of monospaced characters that may appear on a single line. It is related to the line length in typesetting.

== History ==
The limit of the line length in 70–80 characters may well have originated from various technical limitations of various equipment. The American teletypewriters could type only 72 CPL, while the British ones even less, 70 CPL. In the era of typewriters, most designs of the typewriter carriage were limited to 80–90 CPL. Standard paper sizes, such as the international standard A4, also impose limitations on line length: using the US standard Letter paper size (8.5×11"), it is only possible to print a maximum of 85 or 102 characters (with the font size either 10 or 12 characters per inch) without margins on the typewriter. With various margins – usually from 1–1.5 inches (25–38 mm) for each side, but there is no strict standard – these numbers may shrink to 55–78 CPL.

In computer technology, a line of an IBM punched card consisted of 80 characters. Widespread computer terminals such as DEC's VT52 and VT100 mostly followed this standard, showing 80 CPL and 24 lines. This line length was carried over into the original 80×25 text mode of the IBM PC, along with its clones and successors. To this day, virtual terminals most often display 80×24 characters.

The "long" line of 132 CPL comes from mainframes' line printers. However, some printers or printing terminals could print as many as 216 CPL, given certain extra-wide paper sizes and/or extra-narrow font sizes.

== In modern computing ==
With the advent of desktop computing and publishing, and technologies such as TrueType used in word processing and web browsing, a uniform CPL has been made mostly obsolete. HTML (and some other modern text presentation formats) uses dynamic word wrapping which is more flexible than characters per line restriction and may produce a text block with non-rectangular shape, just like in paper typesetting.

Many plain text documents still conform to 72 CPL out of tradition (e.g., RFC 678).

== In programming ==
Many style guides for computer programming define the maximum or desirable number of characters in a line of source code:

Characters per line	Programming style
72	Ada; Agda
79	Python
80	Google; C++; Objective-C/C++; Python; R; JavaScript; Java; Linux kernel (preferred, not hard requirement); Object Pascal; OpenBSD; Perl; PHP; Ruby; OCaml
88	Python, The Black code style
90	CCM4
100	Android; Common Lisp; Google Java; Rust (rustfmt default); Zig (preferred, not hard requirement)
102	Racket
120	PHP
132	Fortran (until 2023); Blink; Moodle
140	Puppet
180	Mono
undefined	Go; JavaScript (JavaScript has no official style guide)

With the increasingly common use of larger widescreen monitors, some of these limits have been relaxed, as in the Linux kernel and FreeBSD.

== See also ==
- IBM 80-column punched card format
- Common text modes
- Apple 80-Column Text Card
- Column (typography)
- Line length (the equivalent concept for non-monospaced text)
