= Microsoft Language Portal =

Online dictionary

Microsoft Language Portal was a multilingual online dictionary of computing terms.

It also offered free downloads of localization style guides, translations of user interface text, and a feedback feature. It was made public in 2009.

The original website was closed on June 30th, 2023, and the content was made available on the Microsoft Learn Portal instead, under the title Microsoft language resources.
