= List of TeX typesetting software and tools =

This is a list of software and programming tools for the TeX typesetting system, which includes distributions, engines, editors, macro packages, and related projects.

== Engines ==
- TeX — original typesetting engine designed by Donald Knuth
- pdfTeX — TeX engine with direct PDF output and microtypography extensions
- XeTeX — Unicode-based TeX engine with advanced font support
- LuaTeX — TeX engine with Lua scripting integration
- e-TeX — extended TeX with additional primitives
- Omega — multilingual extension of TeX

== Active distributions ==
- TeX Live
- MacTeX
- MiKTeX

== Editors and IDEs ==
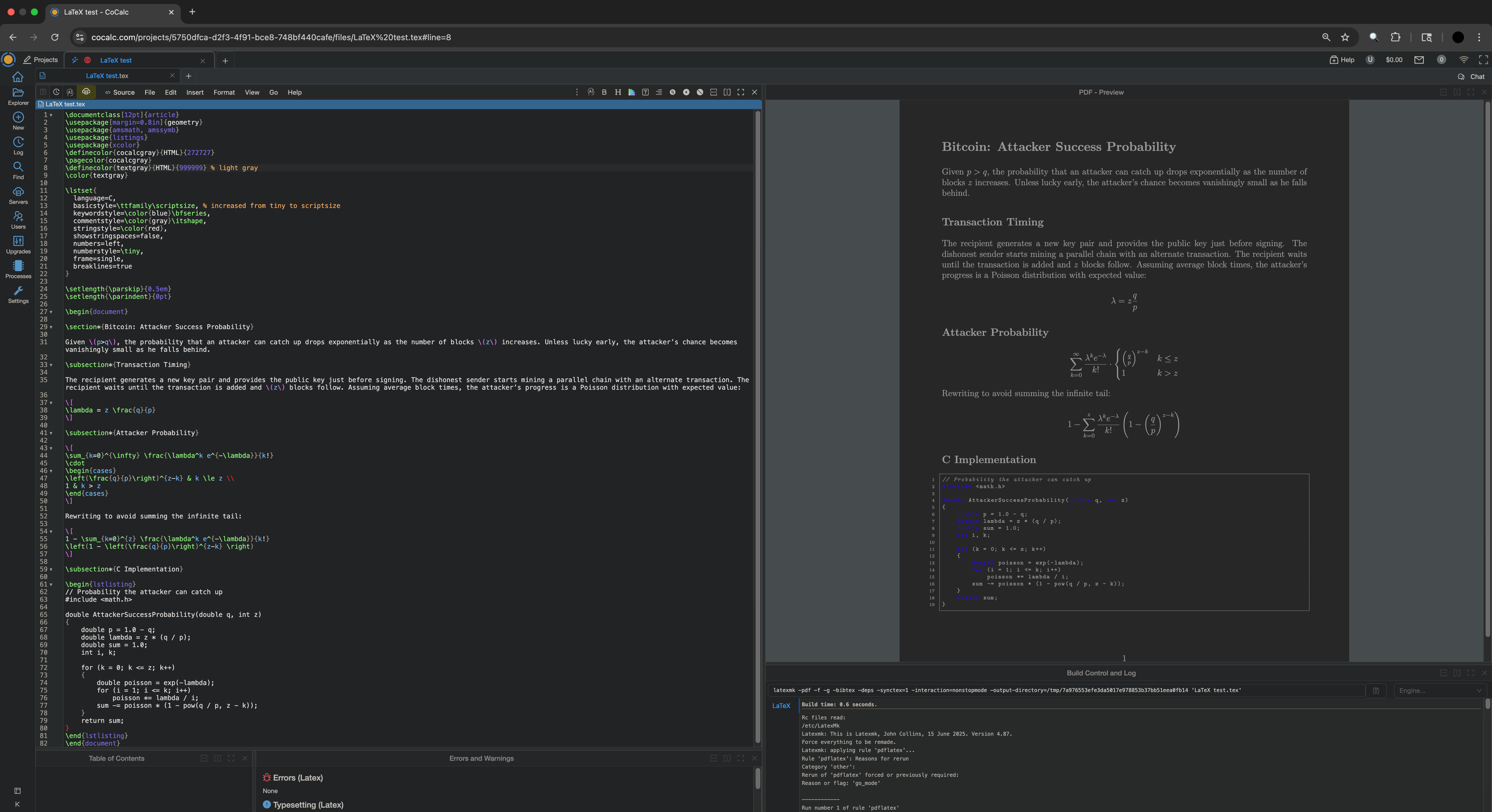
CoCalc LaTeX White Paper in dark mode

- AUCTeX
- Authorea
- CoCalc
- Crixet
- Enter TeX
- GNOME LaTeX
- Gummi
- Kile
- latexwriter
- LyX
- Notepad++
- Overleaf
- Scientific WorkPlace
- TeXmacs
- Texmaker
- TeXnicCenter
- TeXShop
- TeXstudio
- TeXworks
- Verbosus
- Vim
- Visual Studio Code
- WinEdt
- WinShell

== Macro packages and formats ==
- Plain TeX — original macro package written by Donald Knuth
- LaTeX — high-level macro package and document preparation system
- ConTeXt — macro package focused on consistency and design
- AMS-LaTeX — extensions by the American Mathematical Society
- REVTeX — macros for American Physical Society journals
- BibTeX — tool for bibliographic management
- Biber — modern BibTeX replacement

== Converters ==
- LaTeX2HTML — convert LaTeX documents to HTML
- TeX4ht — convert TeX/LaTeX to HTML, XML, and other formats.
- Pandoc — universal document converter with LaTeX support

=== Web renderers ===
- KaTeX — JavaScript library to render LaTeX math in web browsers
- MathJax — JavaScript engine for displaying LaTeX and MathML in browsers

== Output viewers ==
- xdvi — Device independent file format (DVI) viewer for X Window System
- Evince — document viewer supporting DVI and PDF
- Okular — KDE document viewer supporting DVI, PDF, PostScript.
- SumatraPDF — lightweight Windows viewer supporting PDF and DVI
- Preview — built-in macOS PDF/DVI viewer

== See also ==
- List of TeX extensions
- Free TeX software
- List of Markdown editors
- Comprehensive TeX Archive Network (CTAN) – TeX-related material and software can be found for download
