= WinEdt =

TeX editor and shell for Windows

- Developer: Aleksander Simonic
- Stable release: 11.1 / 19 May 2023; 2 years ago
- Operating system: Windows
- Type: LaTeX
- License: shareware
- Website: www.winedt.com

WinEdt is a shareware Unicode (UTF-8) editor and shell for Microsoft Windows. It is primarily used for the creation of TeX (or LaTeX) documents, but can also be used to edit HTML or any other type of text file. It can be configured to run as a front-end for a variety of TeX systems, including MiKTeX, fpTeX and TeX Live. WinEdt's highlighting schemes can be customized for different modes and its spell checking functionality supports multi-lingual setups, with dictionaries (word-lists) for many languages available for downloading from WinEdt's Community Site. It supports DVI and PDF workflow.

== Features ==
- 32- and 64-bit versions.
- Unicode capabilities.
- Multiple document interface, including management of included files in a WinEdt project definition file.
- Syntax highlighting.
- Code folding.
- Right-to-left languages support.
- Chapters and sections can be displayed in a collapsible tree menu.
- Management of bibliographic entries and labels.
- Configurable execution of LaTeX, TeX, AMSTeX, PDFLaTeX, PDFTeX, LuaLaTeX, LuaTeX, XeLaTeX, XeTeX, TeXify, PDFTeXify, BibTeX, MakeIndex, dvi2ps, dvi2pdf, ConTeXt, MetaPost, Metafont, TeX4ht, TtH, and MiKTeX.
- Access to common mathematical symbols and text formatting via GUI buttons.
- Supports forward and inverse search with MiKTeX/TeXLive and SumatraPDF.
- Comes with a full macro language and a record/play feature.
- Parsing of document compilation errors.

== History ==
WinEdt was developed by Aleksander Simonic in 1993 for Windows 3.1. It was uploaded to CTAN in 1995 as shareware for Windows 3.1 and Windows 95. Version 5.6 runs well on Windows XP and Vista. Version 6.0 was released for Windows 2000, XP and 7 on March 17, 2010. Since version 8.0 32- and 64-bit binaries are provided.

== See also ==
- Comparison of text editors
- Comparison of TeX editors
- List of text editors
- Texmaker – An open-source cross-platform editor and shell
- TeXstudio – An open-source cross-platform editor and shell (with an interface similar to Texmaker)
- TeXnicCenter – An open-source Windows editor and shell
- TeXworks – An open-source cross-platform editor and shell
