= Gummi (software) =

LaTeX editor for Linux

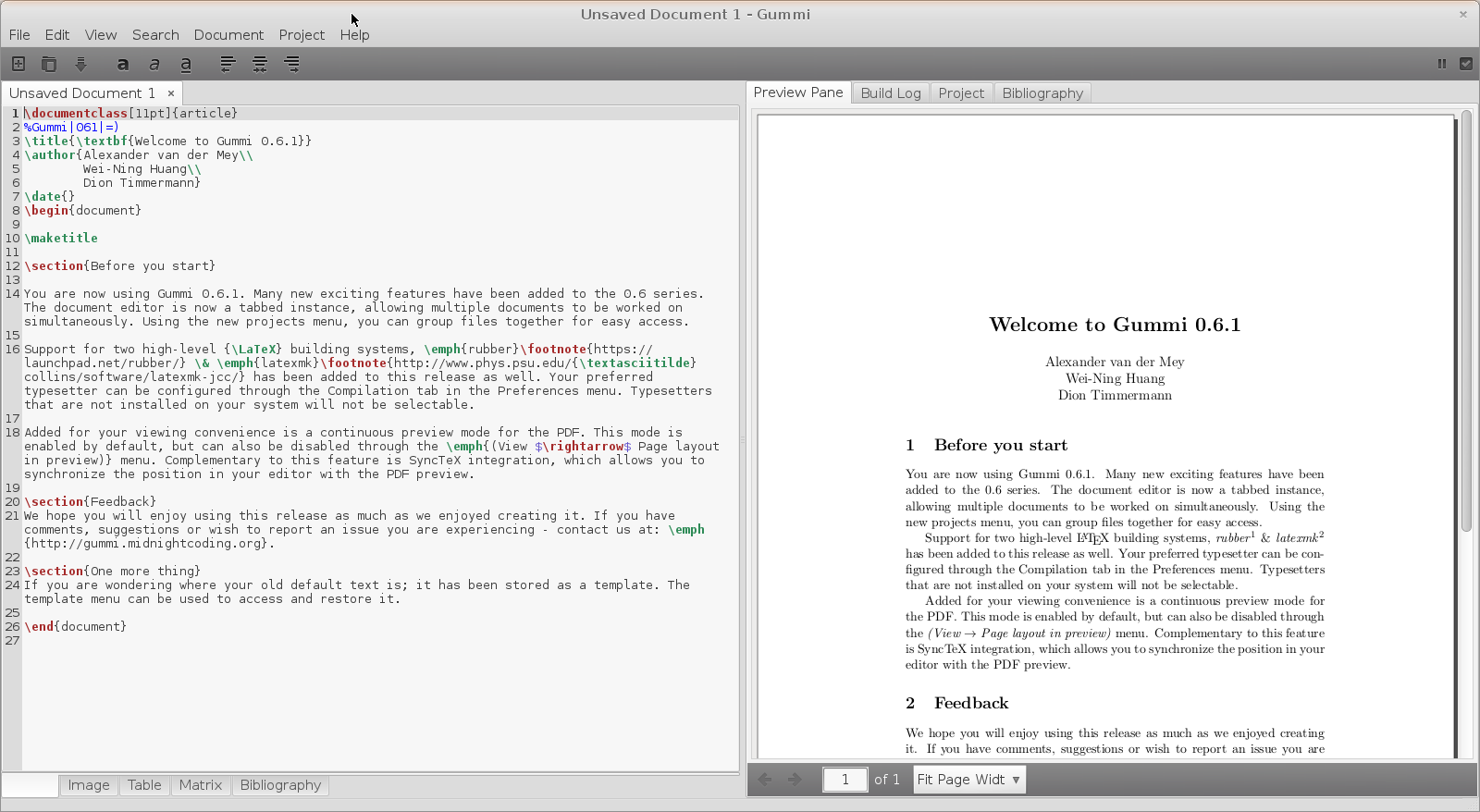
- Gummi 0.6.1 under a Gnome 3 environment
- Developers: Alexander van der Mey, Wei-Ning Huang, Dion Timmermann and Robert Schroll
- Stable release: 0.8.3 / April 29, 2022; 3 years ago
- Written in: C
- Operating system: Linux (GTK+ environment)
- Available in: Multilingual
- Type: TeX/LaTeX editor
- License: MIT
- Website: https://github.com/alexandervdm/gummi
- Repository: github.com/alexandervdm/gummi

Gummi is a LaTeX editor. It is a GTK+ application which runs on Linux systems.

== Features ==
Gummi has many useful features for editing LaTeX source code, such as:

- Live preview: The pdf is shown without the need to compile it manually
- Snippets: LaTeX snippets can be configured
- Graphical insertion of tables and images
- Templates and wizards for new document creation
- Project management
- Bibliography management
- SyncTeX integration

However, it lacks some features available in other editors:

- Compare (available in WinEdt, Vim-LaTeX (LaTeX-suite), TeXmacs...).
- Graphical insertion of mathematical symbols (available in Gnome LaTeX, TeXnicCenter, Kile, ...).
- Document structure summary (available in Gnome LaTeX, Kile, ...).

== Installation ==
Gummi is available in the official repositories of various Linux distributions, such as Arch Linux, Debian, Fedora, Gentoo, and Ubuntu.

== See also ==
- List of text editors
- Comparison of text editors
- Comparison of TeX editors
