= TeXworks =

TeX editor

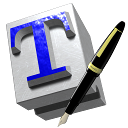

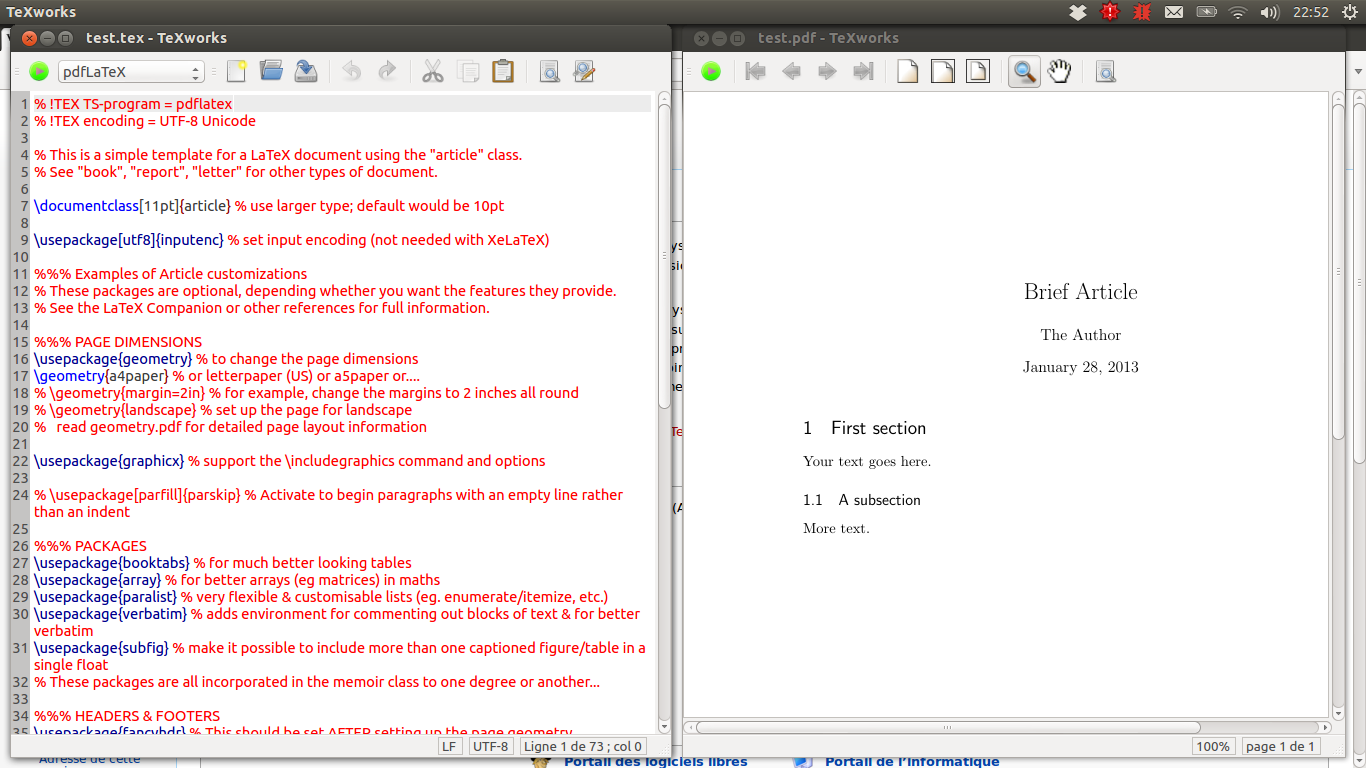
- Developers: Jonathan Kew; Stefan Löffler; Charlie Sharpsteen
- Release: September 2009; 17 years ago
- Stable release: 0.6.11 / 10 February 2026; 8 months ago
- Operating system: Cross-platform
- Available in: Multilingual
- Type: TeX, LaTeX, ConTeXt, XeTeX editor
- License: GPL-2.0-or-later
- Website: TeXworks
- Repository: github.com/TeXworks/texworks

TeXworks is free and open-source application software, available for Windows, Linux and macOS. It is a Qt-based graphical user interface to the TeX typesetting system and its LaTeX, ConTeXt, and XeTeX extensions. TeXworks is targeted at direct generation of PDF output. It has a built-in PDF viewer using the poppler library; the viewer has auto-refresh capability, and also features SyncTeX support (which allows the user to synchronize the PDF viewer position with the source, and vice versa with a single click).

The developer of TeXworks is Jonathan Kew (who also developed XeTeX), who deliberately modelled TeXworks on Richard Koch’s award-winning TeXShop software for macOS to lower the entry barrier to the TeX world for those using desktop operating systems other than macOS. Kew argued against complex user interfaces like that of TeXnicCenter or Kile, which he described as intimidating for new users.

TeXworks requires a TeX installation: TeX Live, MiKTeX, or MacTeX. MiKTeX 2.8 (and 2.9) comes bundled with TeXworks, even in the base installation.

One limitation of TeXworks is that it does not by itself support multi-stage typesetting options, such as PNG or SVG output via intermediate DVI. This is a design choice, as such workflows are considered too advanced for the beginning user. The user has to write a shell or batch script to use such workflows with TeXworks.

== See also ==
- Comparison of TeX editors
- Texmaker
- TeXstudio
