= TeX Directory Structure =

Directory hierarchy in typesetting software

In typesetting software, TeX Directory Structure (TDS) is a directory hierarchy for macros, fonts, and the other implementation-independent TeX system files. The top-level directories are

Directory	Description
tex	TeX files (including LaTeX and other macro packages)
bibtex	BibTeX files
doc	user documentation
fonts	font-related files
metafont	METAFONT files
metapost	MetaPost files
scripts	platform-independent executables
source	sources

TDS is used by several TeX distributions, including teTeX, TeX Live and MiKTeX.

== See also ==
- TeX Live
- TeX
- LaTeX
