= WinShell =

LaTeX editor

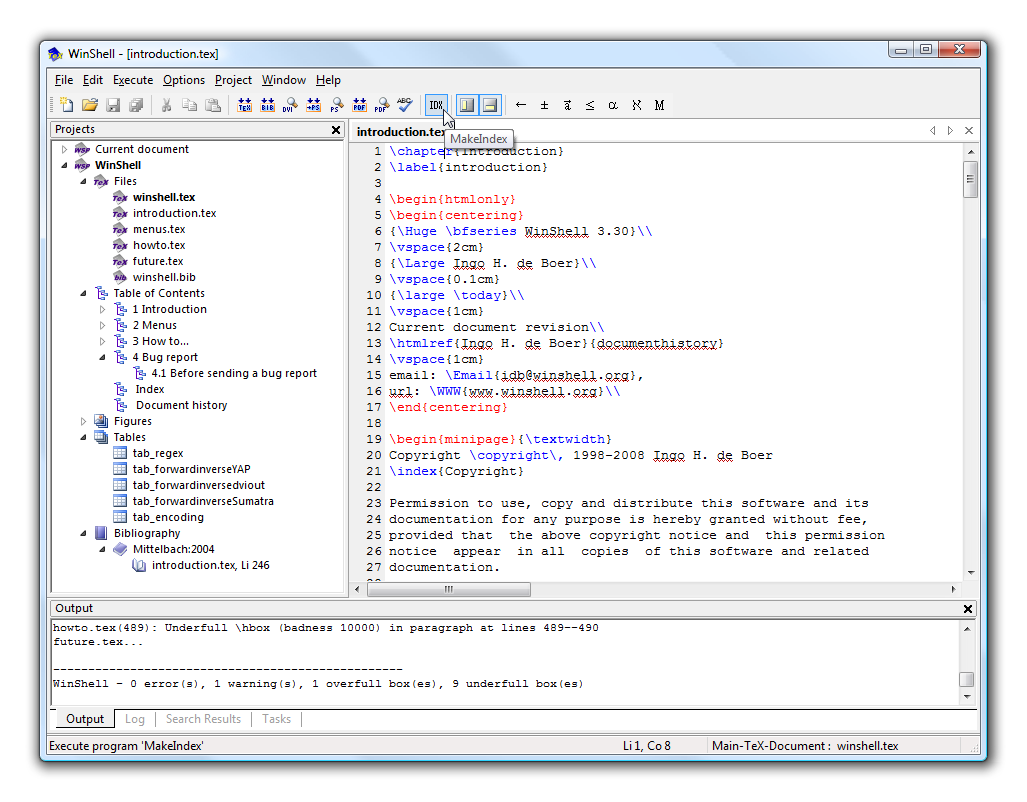
- Freeware multilingual IDE for LaTeX.
- Original author: Ingo H. de Boer
- Stable release: 4.0.0.6 / May 27, 2023
- Operating system: Microsoft Windows
- Available in: Multilingual (22)
- Type: TeX, LaTeX, Editor
- License: Freeware
- Website: https://www.winshell.org

WinShell is a freeware, closed-source multilingual integrated development environment (IDE) for LaTeX and TeX for Windows.

WinShell includes a text editor, syntax highlighting, project management, spell checking, a table wizard, BibTeX front-end, Unicode support, different toolbars, user configuration options and it is portable (e.g. on a USB drive). It is not a LaTeX system; an additional LaTeX compiler system for Microsoft Windows (such as MiKTeX or TeX Live) is required.

== Languages ==
Supported languages are Brazilian Portuguese, Catalan, Chinese, Czech, Danish, Dutch, English, French, Galician, German, Hungarian, Italian, Japanese, Mexico Spanish, Polish, Portuguese, Russian, Serbian, Spain Spanish, Swedish and Turkish.

== Interoperability ==
WinShell works with the MiKTeX, the TeX Live and the W32TeX distribution. At first start, WinShell recognizes the distribution and sets the command-line arguments automatically. Similarly with the viewer for the generated PDF documents. For Acrobat Reader, WinShell closes the PDF document before compiling. For SumatraPDF, WinShell automatically sets the correct commands to achieve forward and inverse search between WinShell and SumatraPDF.

== See also ==
- Comparison of text editors
- Crimson Editor, an open-source Windows editor
- List of text editors
- LyX, an open-source cross-platform editor and shell
- Texmaker, an open-source cross-platform editor and shell
- TeXnicCenter, an open-source Windows editor and shell
- WinTeXShell, opensource TeX editor for Windows http://www.projectory.de/texshell/
