= Verbosus =

Browser-based LaTeX editor

- Stable release: 4.1.3
- Type: Web application
- License: Freeware
- Website: www.verbosus.com

Verbosus is a browser-based LaTeX editor which allows a user to create and handle LaTeX projects in a browser. The graphical user interface (GUI) deliberately does not resemble non-browser-based editors such as TeXworks. It was designed to function and be used in a browser.

Verbosus requires no installation of any software packages like MiKTeX, TeX Live, etc.

As it is the case in other non-browser-based Latex tools a PDF-Viewer is integrated which allows to generate a .pdf out of the Latex-Code. A preview is displayed on the side of the Latex Code. Additionally, the editor supports syntax highlighting which increases the readability as well as code completion.

The connection between the web browser and server is secured by using the HTTPS protocol which provides encryption and secure identification of the server.

== Technology ==
The client side of Verbosus was developed entirely in JavaScript. In addition, it uses the Dojo Toolkit for server communication. The integrated approach of using JavaScript-On-Demand allows the (for the user transparent) reloading of contents without the need to reload the whole page. Since JavaScript is used as the core-technology no additional plug-in (like Adobe Flash Player, etc.) is required.

== Mobile platforms ==
VerbTeX is an application for Android, iOS and Windows that uses the interface of Verbosus to synchronize data and generate the PDF from LaTeX code. Since version 3.4 there exists a native Android App called Anoc which is an Octave editor that also uses the interface of Verbosus to generate the result and create plots.

== Collaboration ==
Verbosus supports simultaneous, collaborative editing of the same project by different users. A built-in tool that implements the diff-algorithm displays conflicting changes and allows a user to resolve conflicts after deciding which version is the correct one.

== See also ==
- Comparison of TeX editors
