= Comparison of TeX editors =

The following is a comparison of TeX editors.

== Table of editors ==
Properties of TeX editors 1
Name	Editing style (Note: "Source" means you see and edit the TeX source files. "WYSIWYM" = What You See Is What You Mean, i.e. you see and edit formatted text. WYSIWYG means that see the output file automatically updated during the edit. Note that some PDF viewers (e.g. evince) automatically reload the PDF document when it is updated on the disk. So, any "source" TeX editor can be turned into partial WYSIWYG editor by opening such a reader in an adjacent window.)	Native operating systems	Latest release		Costs	License	Configurable	Integrated viewer
Name	Editing style	Native operating systems	Version	Date	Costs	License	Configurable	Integrated viewer
AUCTeX	Source	Linux, macOS, Windows	14.1.2	2026-01-14	Free	GPL	Yes	Yes
Authorea	Source / partial-WYSIWYG	Online	—N/a	—N/a	Free	Proprietary	Yes	Yes
Bibby AI	Source / partial-WYSIWYM (Note: Offers a rich-text mode alongside LaTeX source.)	Online	—N/a	—N/a	Freemium	Proprietary	?	Yes
CoCalc	Source	Online	—N/a	—N/a	Free	AGPL + Commons Clause	Yes	Yes
GNOME LaTeX	Source	Linux	3.49.0	2026-01-03	Free	GPL	Yes	No
Gummi	Source	Linux	0.8.3	2022-04-29	Free	MIT	Yes	Yes (Live update)
Kile	Source	Linux (macOS, Windows) (Note: Support for non-Linux systems considered experimental.)	2.1.3	2012-09-23	Free	GPL	Yes	Yes (Quick preview)
LyX	WYSIWYM	Linux, macOS, Windows	2.5.3	2026-09-17	Free	GPL	Yes	Yes
Notepad++	Source	Windows	8.9.8.1	2026-09-24	Free	GPL	Yes	No, but can be integrated (Note: Notepad++ can execute Tex viewers)
Overleaf	Source	Online	—N/a	—N/a	Free	AGPLv3	Yes	Yes
Prism (Note: Formerly Crixet, a cloud LaTeX platform acquired by OpenAI and relaunched as Prism in January 2026. Crixet is no longer offered separately.)	Source	Online	—N/a	—N/a	Free (Note: Requires a ChatGPT account.)	Proprietary	?	Yes
Scientific WorkPlace	WYSIWYM	Windows	6.1.2	2021-07-01	Free	Proprietary	Yes	Yes
Sublime Text	Source	Linux, macOS, Windows	—N/a	—N/a	Non-free	Proprietary	Yes	No, but can be integrated (Note: Via the LaTeXTools package.)
TeX Live	Source	FreeBSD, Linux, macOS, NetBSD, Solaris, Windows	—N/a	2025-3-8	Free	LaTeX Project Public License	Yes	No (used by other editors/tools)
TeXmacs (Note: TeXmacs is an original document preparation system, with own syntax and own algorithms, but can be used to obtain TeX files through its LaTeX export capability.)	WYSIWYG	Linux, macOS, Windows	2.1.5	2026-03-12	Free	GPL	Yes	Partial (preview using system Pdf viewer)
Texmaker	Source	Linux, macOS, Windows	6.0.2	2026-08-11	Free	GPL2	Yes	Yes
TeXnicCenter	Source	Windows	2.02	2013-09-29	Free	GPL	Yes	No
TeXShop	Source	macOS	5.57	2025-10-03	Free	GPL	Yes	Yes
TeXstudio	Source	Linux, macOS, Windows	4.9.9	2026-10-23	Free	GPL2	Yes	Yes (pdf, selection with dvi2png)
TeXworks	Source	Linux, macOS, Windows	0.6.11	2026-02-10	Free	GPL	No	Yes (pdf)
Verbosus	Source	Online, Android, iOS, Windows	—N/a	—N/a	Free	Proprietary	Yes	Yes (pdf)
Vim	Source	Linux, macOS, Windows	9.2	2026-02-14	Free	Vim	Yes	No
Visual Studio Code	Source	Linux, macOS, Windows	1.142.0	2026-10-14	Free	Source code: MIT; Microsoft-built binaries: Proprietary	Yes	Yes (pdf) (Note: Requires installation of LaTeX Workshop extension.)
WinEdt	Source	Windows	11.1	2023-05-19	Non-free	Proprietary	Yes	Yes
WinShell	Source	Windows	4.0.0.6	2023-05-27	Free	Proprietary	Yes	No
Name	Editing style	Native operating systems	Version	Date	Costs	License	Configurable	Integrated viewer
Name	Editing style	Native operating systems	Latest release		Costs	License	Configurable	Integrated viewer

Properties of TeX editors 2
Name	Inverse search (Note: Inverse search means that one can locate the relevant part of the source code from the viewer (e.g., double-clicking in dvi or pdf file brings up the appropriate line/paragraph in the latex code))	DDE support (Note: On Windows some pdf viewers like Sumatra PDF or Adobe Reader don't use command line arguments for forward search, but the editor sends the document position to them using Dynamic Data Exchange)	Organises Projects	Menu for inserting symbols	Document comparison	Spell-checking	Multiple undo-redo
AUCTeX	Yes	No	Partial (master file)	Yes	Yes	Yes (Note: Requires installation of extra package.)	Yes
Authorea	Yes	—N/a	Yes	No	No	Yes	Yes
Bibby AI	?	—N/a	Yes	?	?	?	?
CoCalc	Yes	—N/a	No	No	No	Yes	Yes
GNOME LaTeX	Yes	—N/a	Yes	Yes	No	Yes	Yes
Gummi	Yes	—N/a	Yes	No	No	Yes	Yes
Kile	Yes	No	Yes	Yes	No	Yes	Yes
LyX	Yes	?	No	Yes	Yes	Yes	Yes
latexwriter	Yes	Yes	Yes	Yes	Yes	Yes	Yes
Notepad++	Yes, with SumatraPDF	Yes, with a DDE client	Yes	Partial (Note: A plug-in is required.)	Yes	Yes	Yes
Overleaf	Yes	No	Yes	No	Yes	Yes	Yes
Prism	?	—N/a	Yes	?	?	?	?
Scientific WorkPlace	—N/a	?	?	Yes	No	Yes	No (one level)
Sublime Text	Yes (Note: Via the LaTeXTools package.)	?	Yes	?	?	Yes	Yes
TeXmacs	—N/a	Yes	Partial (shows document parts)	Yes	Partial (for own format only)	Yes	Yes
Texmaker	Yes	No	Partial (master file)	Yes	No	Yes	Yes
TeXnicCenter	Yes	Yes	Yes	Yes	No	Yes	Yes
TeXShop	Yes	No	No	Yes (Note: LaTeX panel & Matrix panel)	No	Yes	Yes
TeXstudio	Yes	Yes	Partial (master file)	Yes	Yes	Yes	Yes
TeXworks	Yes	No	No	No	No	Yes (Note: Requires installation of extra package)	Yes
Verbosus	Yes	No	Yes	Yes	No	No	Yes
Vim	Yes	?	Yes	Yes	No	Yes	Yes
Visual Studio Code	Yes	?	Yes	Yes	Yes	Yes	Yes
WinEdt	Yes	Yes	Yes	Yes	Yes	Yes	Yes
WinShell	Yes	No	Yes	Yes	No	Yes	Yes
Name	Inverse search	DDE Support	Organises Projects	Menu for inserting symbols	Document comparison	Spell-checking	Multiple undo-redo

Properties of TeX editors 3
Name	Collapsible sections	Find and replace using RegEx	Intelligent error handling	Autocompletion of LaTeX commands	Parenthesis matching	Starts up to previous state (Note: Starts up to previous state including the current editing point.)	Unicode support	RTL Support (Note: RTL support means Right to Left language support.)
AUCTeX	Yes	Yes	Yes	Yes	Yes	Yes (Note: configurable as an option of the Emacs editor)	Yes	Yes
Authorea	No	Yes	No	No	Yes	Yes	Yes	?
Bibby AI	?	?	?	?	?	?	Yes	?
CoCalc	Yes	Yes	No	Yes	Yes	Yes	Yes	?
GNOME LaTeX	Planned	Yes	Yes	Yes	Yes	(just same files)	Yes	Yes
Gummi	No	No	No	No	Yes	No	Yes	?
Kile	Yes (Note: With usual \section{} notation, Kile collapses equations and figures, but not sections. Collapsing of sections is possible with non-standard notation \begin{section}{}...\end{section}{}, but it eliminates sections from Structure View. An alternative possibility is bracketing sections with comments %BEGIN and %END.)	Yes	Yes	Yes	Yes	Yes	Yes	Yes
LatexWriter	No	Yes	Yes	Partial	Yes	Yes	Yes	Yes
LyX	No	Yes	Yes	Yes	Yes	Yes	Yes	Yes
Notepad++	Yes	Yes	No	Partial (Note: This will have to be set up manually.)	Yes	Yes	Yes	Yes
Overleaf	Yes	Yes	Yes	Yes	Yes	Yes	Yes	?
Prism	?	?	?	?	?	?	Yes	?
Scientific WorkPlace	No	?	?	—N/a	Yes	No	Yes	?
Sublime Text	Yes	Yes	?	Yes (Note: Via the LaTeXTools package.)	Yes	Yes	Yes	No
TeXmacs	No	Yes	—N/a	—N/a	—N/a	—N/a	Yes	?
Texmaker	Yes	Yes	Yes	Yes	Yes	Yes	Yes	Yes
TeXnicCenter	since v2.0	since v2.0	Yes	Yes	Yes	Yes	since v2.0	?
TeXShop	No	Yes	Yes	Yes	Yes	Yes	Yes	?
TeXstudio	Yes	Yes	Yes	Yes	Yes	Yes	Yes	Yes
TeXworks	No	Yes (Note: Provides a subset of the regular expression syntax implemented in the Perl scripting language, but fully supports Unicode)	No	Yes (Note: Template file in resource directory ( Documentation of the code completion feature ))	Yes	No	Yes	Yes
Verbosus	No	Yes	Yes	Yes	Yes	No	Yes	?
Vim	Yes	Yes	?	Yes	Yes	Yes	Yes	
Visual Studio Code	Yes	Yes	Yes	Yes	Yes	Yes	Yes	No
WinEdt	Yes	Yes (modified)	Yes	Yes	Yes	Yes	Yes	Yes
WinShell	Yes	Yes	Yes	Yes	Yes	No (just same files)	Yes	?
Name	Collapsible sections	Find and replace using RegEx	Intelligent error handling	Autocompletion of LaTeX commands	Parenthesis matching	Starts up to previous state (Note: Starts up to previous state including the current editing point.)	Unicode support	RTL Support (Note: RTL support means Right to Left language support.)

Screenshots and Video Tutorials of TeX editors
Editor	Screenshot
CoCalc	CoCalc LaTeX white paper in dark mode
LyX	Screenshot
Texmaker	Screenshot of Texmaker version 4.5
TeXmacs	The TeXmacs editor
TeXstudio	Screenshot of TeXstudio (2.12.6)
Visual Studio Code	The LaTex Workshop extension for Visual Studio Code
Editor	Screenshot

== See also ==
- Formula editor
- Chemical structure
- Comparison of word processors
- Comparison of text editors
- Comparison of desktop publishing software
- DrRacket IDE with Scribble
- List of TeX extensions
- SymPy — can create LaTeX from Python mathematical expressions

=== Scientific WYSIWYG editors ===
- GNU TeXmacs
- LyX
- MathType
- Mathcad
- Maple worksheet editor
- Jupyter Notebook
- Scientific WorkPlace
- Authorea
