= Enter TeX =

LaTeX editor for the GNOME desktop environment

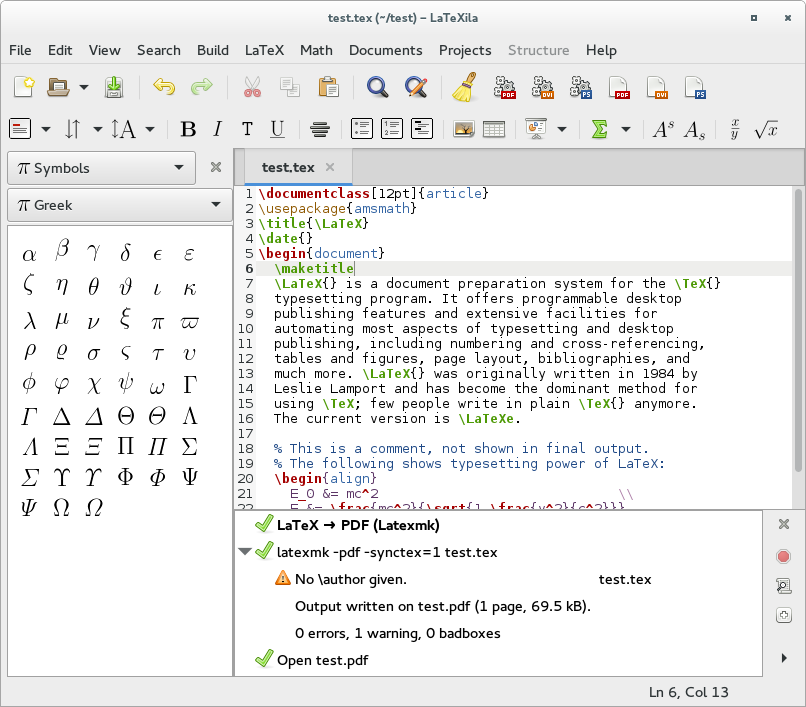
- LaTeXila 3.14 under GTK 3.14
- Developers: Sébastien Wilmet, community, The GNOME Project
- Stable release: 3.49.0 / 3 January 2026; 8 months ago
- Written in: Vala, C
- Operating system: Linux
- Platform: GTK
- Available in: Multilingual
- Type: TeX/LaTeX editor
- License: GPL-3.0-or-later
- Website: gitlab.gnome.org/World/gedit/enter-tex
- Repository: gitlab.gnome.org/World/gedit/enter-tex

Enter TeX (formerly LaTeXila and GNOME LaTeX) is a TeX/LaTeX editor to edit TeX/LaTeX documents. It runs on Linux systems with the GTK library installed.

== Features ==
Enter TeX has many useful features for editing TeX/LaTeX source code, such as:

- Customizable one-click buttons to build, view and convert documents
- Auto-completion of (La)TeX commands
- Graphical lists of symbols for easy insertion
- Templates for new document creation
- Project management
- Summary of the document structure
- Spell checking based on gspell
- Forward and backward search to switch between the sources and the PDF

However, it lacks some features available in other editors:

- Split screen (available in TeXShop, Vim-LaTeX (LaTeX-suite), TeXmacs...)
- Compare (available in WinEdt, Vim-LaTeX (LaTeX-suite), TeXmacs...).

== History ==
Sébastien Wilmet created the project in 2009 as a student and named it LaTeXila. It was subsequently renamed in 2017 to Gnome LaTeX. The project was renamed to Enter TeX in September 2024. The new name was selected because it moved away from Gnome (which is trademarked) and provided future proofing should new formats of TeX be supported in the future (See Wilmet's blog post for more details).

== See also ==
- List of text editors
- Comparison of text editors
- Comparison of TeX editors
