= Scientific WorkPlace =

LaTeX scientific word processor interface

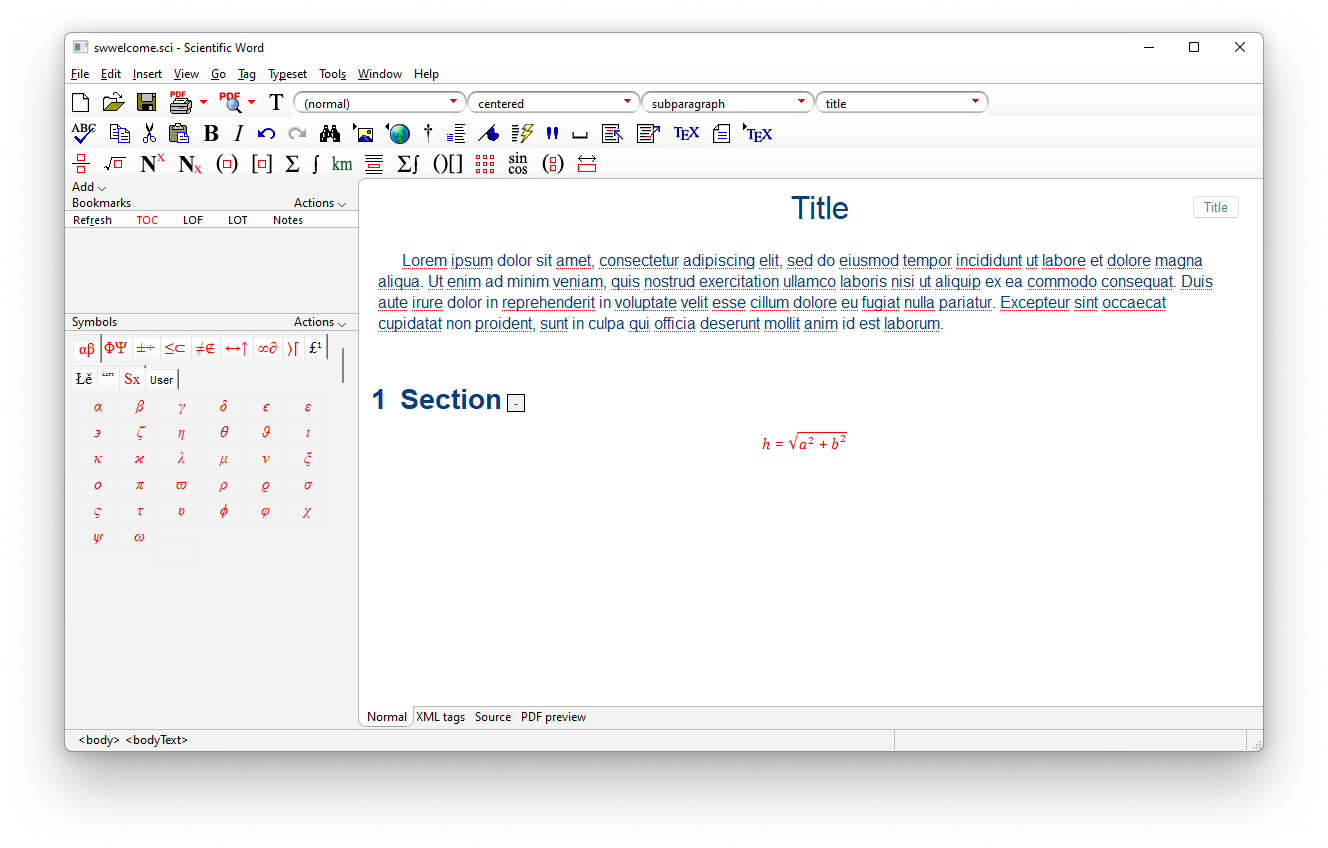
- SWP running on Windows 11
- Developer: MacKichan Software
- Operating system: Windows and macOS
- Available in: English
- Type: Document processor
- Website: Official website

Scientific WorkPlace (often abbreviated to SWP) is a software package for scientific word processing on Microsoft Windows and macOS.

Although advertised as a WYSIWYG LaTeX-based word processor, it is actually a graphical user interface for editing LaTeX source files with the same ease-of-use of a word processor, while maintaining a screen view that resembles but is not identical to the eventual output that LaTeX produces. For instance, its display shows text wrapped to the width of the screen rather than to the eventual page width, and colored equations rather than the black-and-white rendering that LaTeX would normally produce. It also includes an integrated computer algebra system.

Because Scientific WorkPlace is based on LaTeX, it can be used to produce files in the house style of any scientific journal that also uses LaTeX, and the software makes it easy to change the overall style of a document in a single operation. It comes with many predefined styles, but installing a new style can be somewhat complicated.

The developer of Scientific WorkPlace, MacKichan Software, Inc., announced on June 30, 2021 that it had ceased business and would no longer sell licenses to its software. Existing licenses would remain valid, but new installs would need to be verified by its licensing server, which it expected to maintain for at least two years. It also announced that Scientific WorkPlace could not be made open source as the software relied on the computer algebra system MuPAD, a closed-source product. Scientific Word 6.1 (the version without MuPAD) was made freely available for Windows and its source code will be posted to GitHub.

== See also ==
- Comparison of TeX editors
- LyX — An open-source cross-platform alternative with similar functionality
- wxMaxima — An open-source cross-platform CAS that can be used with LyX
- TeXmacs — An open-source cross-platform scientific word processor and typesetting system
