= TeTeX =

Unmaintained TeX software distribution

teTeX
- Developer: Thomas Esser
- Final release: 3.0
- Operating system: Unix-like
- Successor: TeX Live
- Type: TeX distribution
- Website: www.tug.org/tetex/

teTeX (stylised as teTeX) was a TeX distribution for Unix-like systems. As of May 2006, teTeX is no longer actively maintained and its former maintainer Thomas Esser recommended TeX Live as the replacement. During installation of TexLive it is possible to choose scheme that would include teTeX packages.

The teTeX package is available as a package for system architectures:

- Linux (x86, SPARC, PowerPC, Alpha)
- macOS (x86, PowerPC)
- Solaris (x86, SPARC)

Other supported operating systems include:

- OpenBSD and FreeBSD (on x86 architectures)
- IBM AIX on (RS/6000)
- HP-UX (on HPPA)
- Microsoft Windows (on 32-bit systems)
- BeOS (for Intel x86)

== History ==
Thomas Esser maintained teTeX from 1994 until May, 2006. According to Esser, the time taken to package each successive release took longer than the previous. It has been superseded by TeX Live, a "comprehensive TeX system for most types of Unix, including Linux and Mac OS X, and also Windows". The goals of the teTeX project were to be easy, use free software, be well-documented, avoiding bugs along the way.
