= Xdvi =

Open Source Computer Program

xdvi is an open-source computer program written by Paul Vojta for displaying TeX-produced .dvi files under the X Window System on Unix, including Linux.

The xdvi interface has a set of GUI controls and a window displaying a single page of the DVI document. Every time a new version of the .dvi file is saved, xdvi automatically refreshes the display with the new version. xdvi is equipped with "magnifying glasses" for viewing close-ups of portions of the page by clicking on a mouse button while the mouse cursor is over the part of the page to be viewed. xdvi has a set of keyboard shortcuts for bypassing the pointer control.

xdvi can be used with the editor emacs to display the .dvi file of the TeX file currently being edited. There also exists an ability to perform a reverse search, in which a user clicks on a location in the dvi file and emacs jumps to the associated location in the TeX file.
