= Overleaf =

Cloud-based LaTeX editor

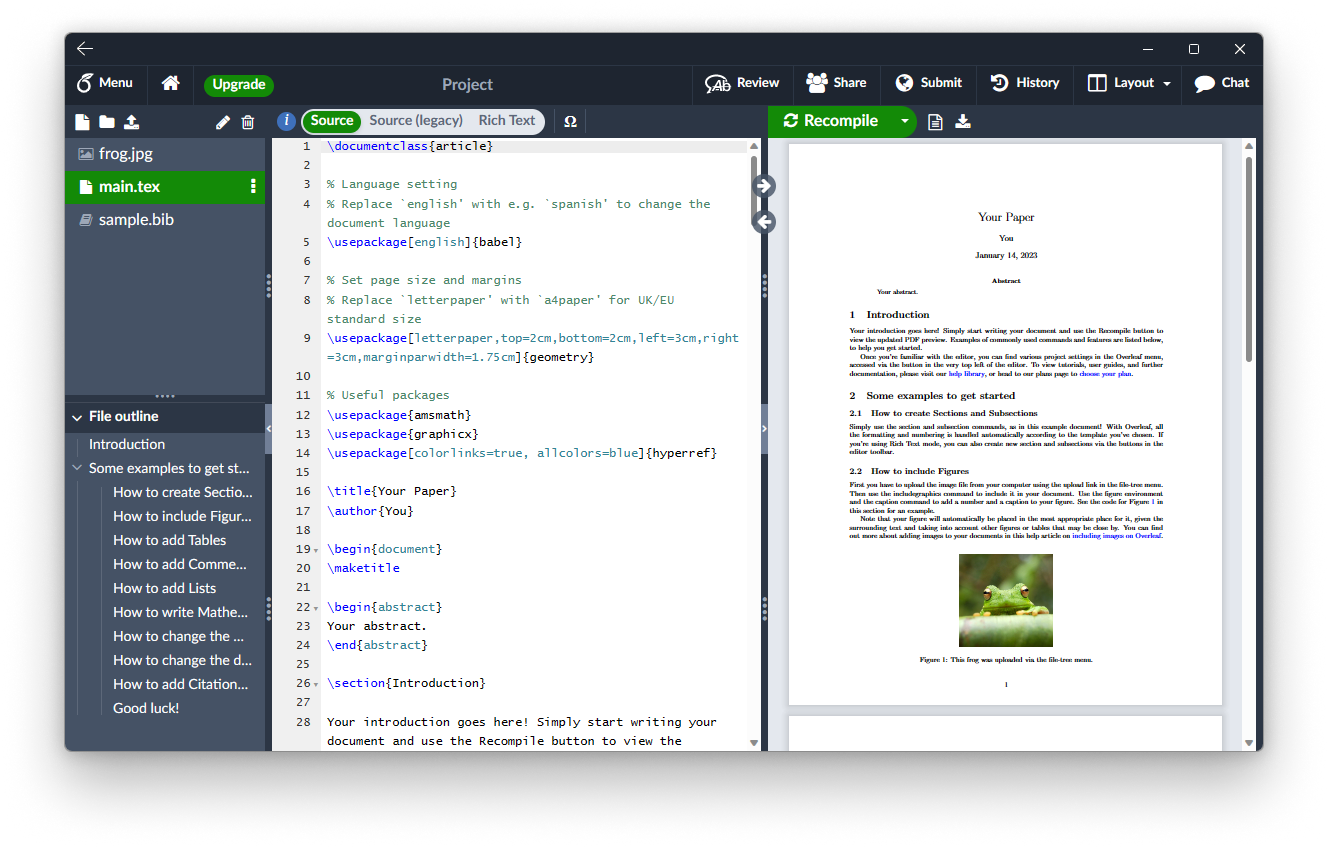
- Overleaf running as a PWA on Windows 11
- Original authors: John Hammersley and John Lees-Miller
- Written in: JavaScript
- Platform: Web platform
- Type: Web application
- License: AGPLv3
- Website: www.overleaf.com
- Repository: github.com/overleaf/

Overleaf is software for running a collaborative cloud-based LaTeX editor used for writing, editing and publishing scientific documents. More precisely, the term "Overleaf" may refer to the free-licensed software itself, to the main website running a proprietary version of the software, or to the organisation hosting the website running the proprietary software version.

The Overleaf organisation works with several scientific publishers to provide official journal LaTeX templates and direct submission links.

The Overleaf software was conceived by John Hammersley and John Lees-Miller, who started developing it in 2011 as WriteLaTeX, through their company WriteLaTeX Limited. Both are mathematicians and were inspired by their own experiences in academia to create a better solution for collaborative scientific writing. They launched a beta version of Overleaf on 16 January 2014, at the first #FuturePub event, held at the British Library in London.

After merging with ShareLaTeX in 2017, the developers released Overleaf v2, combining original features from both into a single cloud-based platform.

== History ==
Overleaf was selected as one of the ten teams who participated to the 2013 Summer's Bethnal Green Ventures (BGV) accelerator programme. That program started on the July 1, 2013, and lasted for 3 months. The Demo Day of that BGV 2013 Summer program was held on the September 19, 2013.

The Overleaf organisation received strategic investment from Digital Science in 2014. Overleaf won Innovative Internet Business at the 2014 Nominet Internet Awards, and featured 99th in SyndicateRoom's 2018 list of Britain's top 100 fastest-growing business.

Overleaf was described as a tool for writing scientific publications in Nature, Science, Red Hat's opensource.com and the German IT magazine Heise Online. In 2017, CERN, Europe's particle-physics laboratory near Geneva, provided the proprietary, hosted version of Overleaf to its members. A survey found that Overleaf was more popular than Authorea and doDoc.

Overleaf provides templates for submission to scientific journals and conferences. For example, the IEEE and Springer (including Nature) mention the possibility for submission using Overleaf.

=== Merge with ShareLaTeX ===
On 20 July 2017, Overleaf acquired ShareLaTeX to create a combined community of over two million users. This led to the creation of Overleaf v2, combining original features from both into a single cloud-based platform hosted at overleaf.com.

In May 2021, Lees-Miller (Overleaf), Paulo Reis (Overleaf), and Sven Laqua (Digital Science) were awarded the SIGCHI Best Case Study Award at the ACM CHI2021 Conference for their case study "Merging SaaS Products In A User-Centered Way: A Case Study of Overleaf and ShareLaTeX".

== See also ==
- Collaborative real-time editor
- Comparison of TeX editors
- TeX – Typesetting system
