= MuPAD =

Computer algebra system (CAS)

- MuPAD running on Windows Vista
- Developer: The Mathworks Inc.
- Stable release: 7.2.0 (R2017a)
- Operating system: Windows, Mac OS X, Linux
- Type: Computer algebra system
- License: Proprietary
- Website: www.mathworks.com/discovery/mupad.html

MuPAD is a computer algebra system (CAS). Originally developed by the MuPAD research group at the University of Paderborn, Germany, development was taken over by the company SciFace Software GmbH & Co. KG in cooperation with the MuPAD research group and partners from some other universities starting in 1997. MuPAD's graphics package was particularly successful, especially considering the era when it was developed.

Until autumn 2005, the version "MuPAD Light" was offered for free for research and education, but as a result of the closure of the home institute of the MuPAD research group, only the version "MuPAD Pro" became available for purchase.

The MuPAD kernel is bundled with Scientific Notebook and Scientific Workplace. Former versions of MuPAD Pro were bundled with SciLab. In MathCAD's version 14 release MuPAD was adopted as the CAS engine.

In September 2008, SciFace was purchased by MathWorks and the MuPAD code was included in the Symbolic Math Toolbox add-on for MATLAB. On 28 September 2008, MuPAD was withdrawn from the market as a software product in its own right. However, it is still available in the Symbolic Math Toolbox in MATLAB and can also be used as a stand-alone program by the command mupad entered into the MATLAB terminal.

The MuPAD notebook feature has been removed in MATLAB R2020a. However, MATLAB's Symbolic Math Toolbox still uses the MuPAD language as part of its underlying computational engine. MATLAB Live Editor is the recommended environment for performing, documenting, and sharing symbolic math computations.

== Functionality ==
MuPAD offers:

- a computer algebra system to manipulate formulas symbolically;
- classic and verified numerical analysis in discretionary accuracy;
- program packages for linear algebra, differential equations, number theory, statistics, and functional programming;
- an interactive graphic system that supports animations and transparent areas in 3D, and;
- a programming language that supports object-oriented programming and functional programming.

Often used commands are accessible via menus. MuPAD offers a notebook concept similar to word processing systems that allows the formulation of mathematical problems as well as graphics visualization and explanations in formatted text.

MuPad does not follow the NIST 4.37 definition for inverse hyperbolic cosine.

It is possible to extend MuPAD with C++ routines to accelerate calculations. Java code can also be embedded.

MuPAD's syntax was modeled on that of the Pascal programming language, and is similar to the one used in the Maple computer algebra system. An important difference between the two is that MuPAD provides support for object-oriented programming. This means that each object "carries with itself" the methods allowed to be used on it. For example, after defining

  A := matrix( [[1,2],[3,4]] )

all of the following are valid expressions and give the expected result:

  A+A, -A, 2*A, A*A, A^-1, exp( A ), A.A, A^0, 0*A

where A.A is the concatenated 2×4 matrix, while all others, including the last two, are again 2×2 matrices.
