= MiKTeX =

Cross-platform TeX/LaTeX distribution

- Developer: Christian Schenk
- Stable release: 26.5 / May 14, 2026; 4 months ago
- Written in: C, C++
- Operating system: Windows, Linux, macOS
- Size: 142 MB (Windows)
- Type: TeX, LaTeX
- License: "several free"
- Website: miktex.org
- Repository: github.com/MiKTeX/miktex

MiKTeX is a free and open-source distribution of the TeX/LaTeX typesetting system compatible with Linux, macOS, and Windows. It also contains a set of related programs. MiKTeX provides the tools necessary to prepare documents using the TeX/LaTeX markup language, as well as a simple TeX editor, TeXworks. The name comes from the login credentials of the chief developer Christian Schenk, MiK for Micro-Kid.

MiKTeX can update itself by downloading new versions of previously installed components and packages, and has an easy installation process. By default, MiKTeX installs only a minimal set of packages (according to the philosophy of "just enough TeX"), which is useful in case of the limited space. It will then ask users whether they wish to download any packages that have not yet been installed but are required to render the current document. A portable version of MiKTeX, as well as a command-line installer of it, are also available.

The latest version of MiKTeX is available at the MiKTeX homepage. In June 2020, Schenk decided to change the numbering convention; the new one is based on the release date. Thus 20.6 was released in June 2020. Since version 2.7, MiKTeX has support for XeTeX, MetaPost and pdfTeX and compatibility with Windows 7. Support for 32-bit computers was dropped in 2022 and for Windows 7 in 2023.

== See also ==
- TeX Live – Another cross-platform LaTeX distribution
- MacTeX – A LaTeX distribution for macOS
- Texmaker – An open-source cross-platform LaTeX editor
- TeXstudio – Another open-source cross-platform LaTeX editor
- LyX – An open-source cross-platform word processor
- TeXnicCenter – An open-source Windows editor
- WinShell – A Windows freeware, closed-source multilingual integrated development environment (IDE)
