= TeXShop =

LaTeX development environment

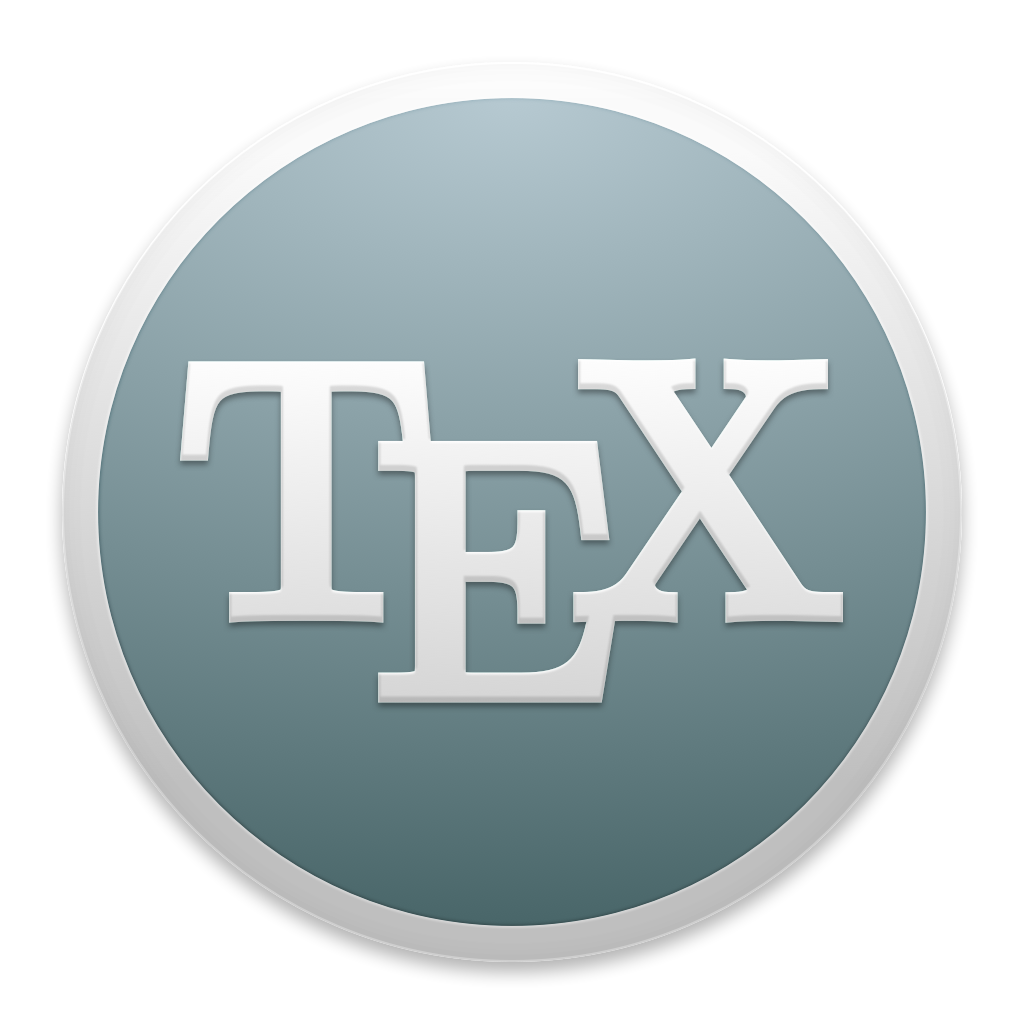

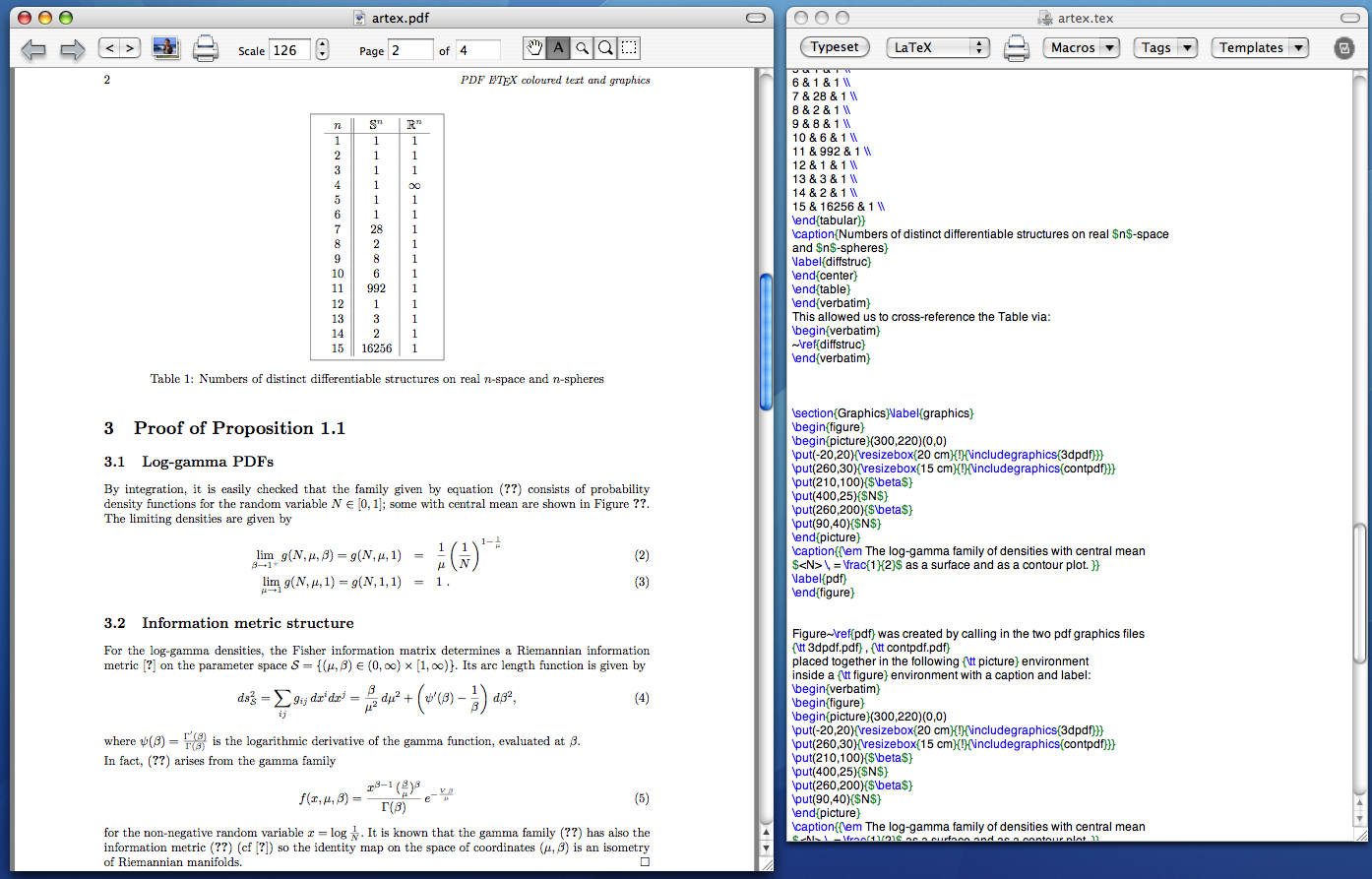
- TeXShop 2.09b under Mac OS X v10.4.6
- Original author: Richard Koch
- Developers: Yusuke Terada; Richard Koch; Max Horn; Dirk Olmes
- Release: 23 July 2000; 26 years ago
- Stable release: 5.59 (for macOS 14.6 (Sonoma) and higher) / 28 October 2026; 14 days ago
- Written in: Objective-C
- Operating system: macOS
- Platform: Arm and Intel
- Type: TeX, LaTeX, XeTeX editor
- License: GNU GPL
- Website: texshop.app
- Repository: github.com/TeXShopProject/TeXShop

TeXShop is a free LaTeX and TeX editor and previewer for macOS. It is licensed under the GNU GPL.

== Details ==
TeXShop was developed by American mathematician Richard Koch. It was modeled on NeXTstep's bundled TeXview.app and developed for the then new macOS user interface Aqua and capitalized on the native PDF support of that version of the Macintosh operating system, which was itself based on NeXTSTEP's successor OPENSTEP. Mitsuhiro Shishikura added a Macro editor, a magnifying glass for the preview window, and the ability to transfer mathematical expressions directly into Keynote presentations. Lacking the TeX eq → eps Service which TeXview afforded, other apps such as LaTeXiT.app were developed to provide Service support. TeXShop requires an existing TeX installation and is currently bundled with the MacTeX distribution.

The program (then version 1.19) won the 2002 Apple Design Award of Best Mac Open Source Port for its capability to display scientific and technical documents created in TeX format. In fact, TeXShop makes it possible, thanks first to "pdfsync.sty", to switch back and forth between code and preview easily, jumping at a corresponding spot, simply by a CMD-click. From TeXShop 1.35 onward this also works with multipart documents, which are joined by "\include". Also, with version 1.35 TeXShop was extended with XeTeX support.

=== Version history ===
The MacOS "Tiger" version of TeXShop is capable of jumping from preview to code and vice versa without pdfsync.sty, using the PDF search technology built into Tiger.

Starting with version 2.18, TeXShop also has included support for SyncTeX. This technology also allows jumping from preview to code and vice versa without including any special style file, but is much more reliable than PDF search, especially for documents that include mathematical formulae.

Version 2.26 in universal binary (PPC+x86) was released on 17 March 2009, requiring Mac OS X 10.4.3 or later with Mac OS X 10.5 recommended. Version 2.28 was released on 7 November 2009 as part of the TeX Live 2009 release of MacTeX.

For users of Mac OS X 10.2 and 10.3, Release 1.43 remains available (as well as v1.35e and 1.19 for 10.1.5 and earlier).

For users of Mac OS X 10.4 through 10.6, Release 2.47 remains available (10.5 or higher is strongly recommended).

As of Release 3.39, a new TeXShop dock icon, designed by Thiemo Gamma, has been used. In Finder, TeXShop documents will still use the original icon (designed by Jérôme Laurens and later re-constructed by William Adams for its use with retina displays) for associated LaTeX documents.

In October 2026, Yusuke Terada took over the development and maintenance of TeXShop from Koch. Version 5.59, released on 28 October 2026 and based on version 5.58, was the first release after the handover. The source code is hosted on GitHub, and the official website is texshop.app. Version 5.59 uses a new update feed, so users of version 5.58 or earlier have to install it manually. Later versions are installed by the automatic update.

Available releases:

5.59: Intel and Arm, Sonoma (14.6) and above

5.57: Intel and Arm, High Sierra through Tahoe

4.79: Sierra and above

4.44: Yosemite through Big Sur

2.47: Systems 10.4, 10.5, 10.6

== See also ==
- Comparison of TeX editors
