= MacTeX =

Distribution of TeX typesetting software for Mac computers

MacTeX Distribution
- Developer: MacTeX TeXnical working group
- Stable release: MacTeX 2026 / March 2, 2026; 3 days ago
- Operating system: macOS 10.14, 10.15, 11, 12, 13, 14 or higher
- Platform: Arm and Intel
- Size: 6.4 GB
- Available in: English
- Type: TeX Live redistribution
- License: Mixed free licenses
- Website: www.tug.org/mactex/
- As of: March 2026

MacTeX is a free redistribution of TeX Live, a typesetting environment based on TeX. While TeX Live is designed to be cross-platform (running on Unix, macOS, and Windows), MacTeX includes Mac-specific utilities and front-ends (such as TeXShop and BibDesk). It is also pre-configured to work out-of-the-box with macOS, as it provides sensible defaults for configuration options that, in TeX Live, are left up to the user to allow for its cross-platform compatibility.

== Details ==
MacTeX is packaged and distributed by the MacTeX TeXnical working group, a subgroup of TeX Users Group (TUG). TeX Live is distributed by the TUG, making MacTeX less a fork of TeX Live than a customised repackaging.

The full MacTeX install package contains three subpackages:

- TeX Live
- GUI applications
  - BibDesk
  - LaTeXiT (a LaTeX equation editor)
  - TeX Live Utility (a utility to update, install or remove parts of TeX Live)
  - TeXShop (a Mac-based TeX editor)
- Ghostscript (an open source version of PostScript)

A substantially smaller version of MacTeX, BasicTeX, which does not contain Ghostscript or the aforementioned GUI programs, can be used instead along with a TeX editor as well. However, it still contains TeX, LaTeX, pdfTeX, MetaFont, dvips, MetaPost, and XeTeX.

== See also ==
- BibDesk
- MiKTeX
- TeX Live
- TeXShop
