= Kile =

TeX/LaTeX editor

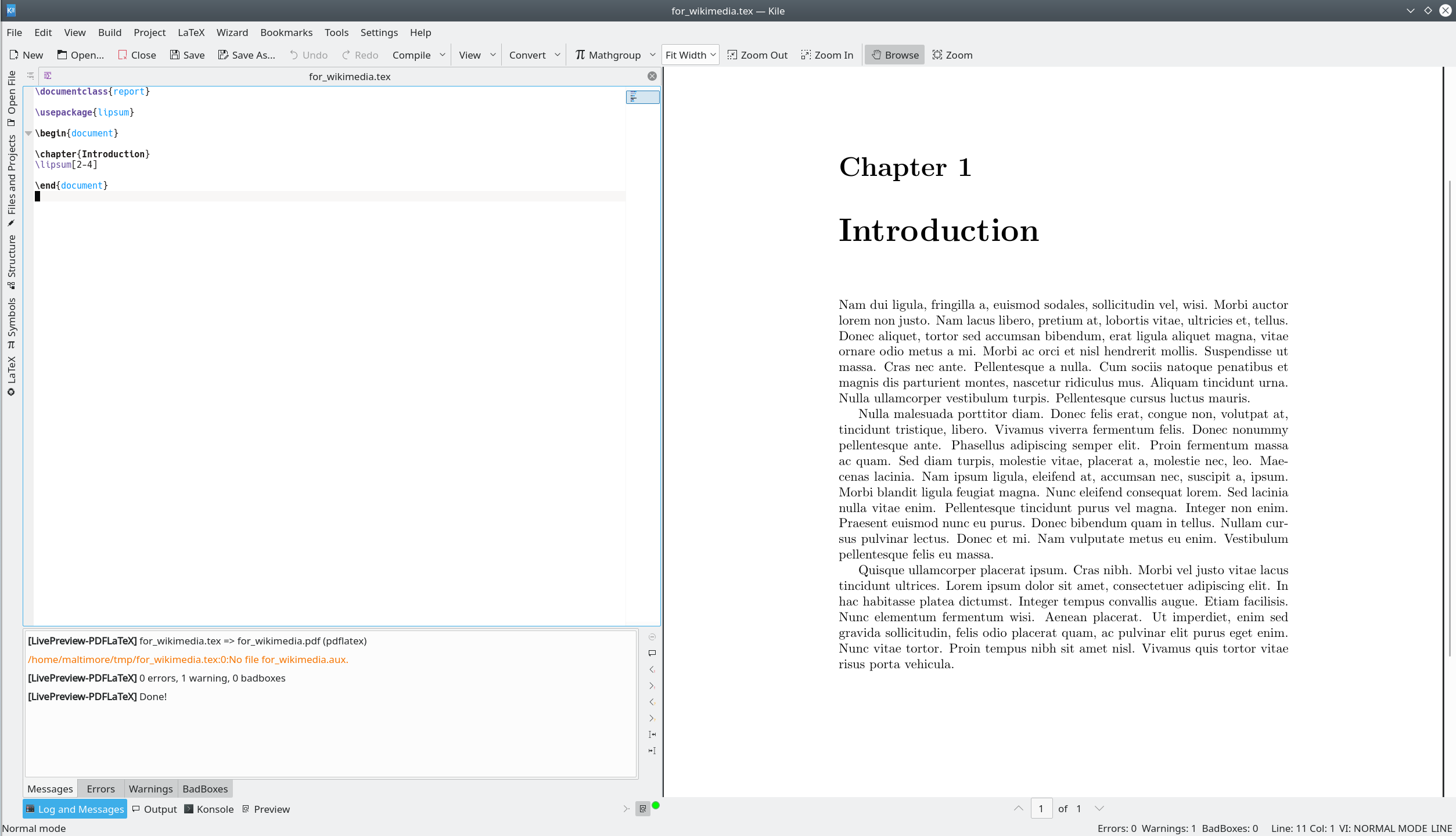
- Kile 2.9.91 under KDE 5.17
- Developer: Community
- Stable release: 2.1.3 / September 23, 2012; 13 years ago
- Preview release: 3.0b4 / March 17, 2024; 21 months ago
- Repository: invent.kde.org/office/kile
- Written in: C++ (KDELibs)
- Operating system: Cross-platform (Mac OS X and Linux, POSIX-compatible Microsoft Windows)
- Available in: Multilingual
- Type: TeX/LaTeX editor
- License: GPL-2.0-or-later
- Website: kile.sourceforge.io

Kile is a TeX/LaTeX editor to edit TeX/LaTeX source code. It runs on Unix-like systems including Mac OS X and Linux, as well as Microsoft Windows via the KDE on Windows initiative, with the Qt and KDE libraries installed.

== Name and Pronunciation ==
Kile means tickle or wedge in Norwegian, the native language of some of the Qt developers. As such, its proper pronunciation is /kiːlə/ and not /kaɪl/.

== Features ==
Kile has many useful features for editing TeX/LaTeX source code, such as:

- Compile, convert and view your document with one click.
- Auto-completion of (La)TeX commands
- Templates and wizards make starting a new document very little work.
- Easy insertion of many standard tags and symbols and the option to define (an arbitrary number of) user defined tags.
- Inverse and forward search: click in the DVI viewer and jump to the corresponding LaTeX line in the editor, or jump from the editor to the corresponding page in the viewer.
- Finding chapter or sections is very easy, Kile constructs a list of all the chapter etc. in your document. You can use the list to jump to the corresponding section.
- Collect documents that belong together into a project.
- Easy insertion of citations and references when using projects.
- Flexible and smart build system to compile your LaTeX documents.
- QuickPreview, preview a selected part of your document.
- Easy access to various help sources.
- Advanced editing commands.

== See also ==
- List of text editors
- Comparison of text editors
- Comparison of TeX editors
