= TeXnicCenter =

Free and open-source IDE for LaTeX

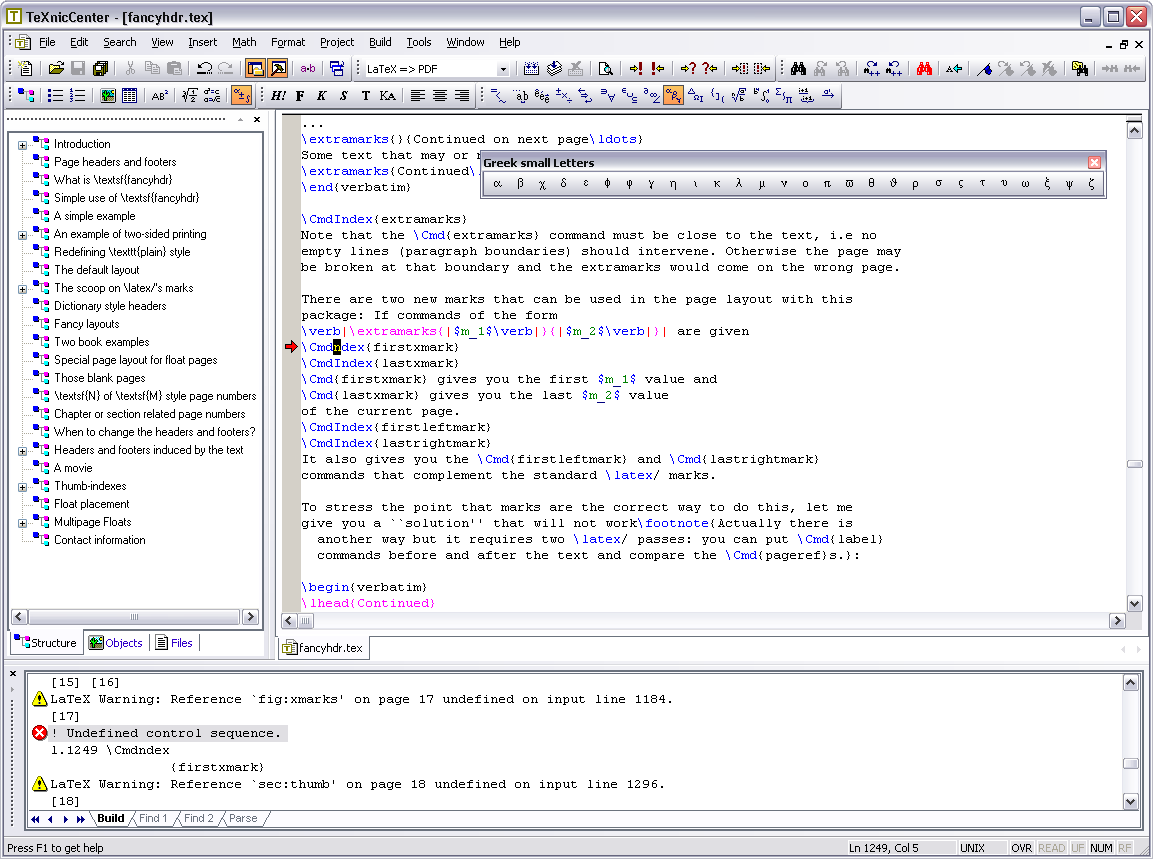
- TeXnicCenter screenshot
- Developer: The TeXnicCenter Team
- Stable release: 2.02 Stable (September 29, 2013) [±]
- Preview release: None [±]
- Written in: C++
- Operating system: Windows
- Type: LaTeX
- License: GPL
- Website: texniccenter.org

TeXnicCenter is a free and open-source IDE for the LaTeX typesetting language. It uses the MiKTeX or TeX Live distributions. It allows the user to type documents in LaTeX and to compile them in PDF, DVI or PS. A menu gives access to precoded elements and environments (formulas, symbols, sections). It also allows for the creation of projects to organize and access the sections and environments of documents, and to insert a bibliography (using BibTeX) and an index (using MakeIndex). TeXnicCenter was first released in 1999 by Sven Wiegand, it is included in ProTeXt and since version 2.02 it supports UTF-8 encoding.

== Interoperability ==
TeXnicCenter has been designed to work with the MiKTeX distribution. After installation, TeXnicCenter recognizes MiKTeX and sets up the paths to command-line compilers bundled with MiKTeX automatically. Similarly, Adobe Acrobat Reader/Professional or Foxit Reader, when available, is configured as a viewer for the generated PDF documents. TeXnicCenter can tell Acrobat to close an opened PDF file before recompiling it with LaTeX using Dynamic Data Exchange calls.

== See also ==
- Comparison of TeX editors
