= LyX =

Document processing software

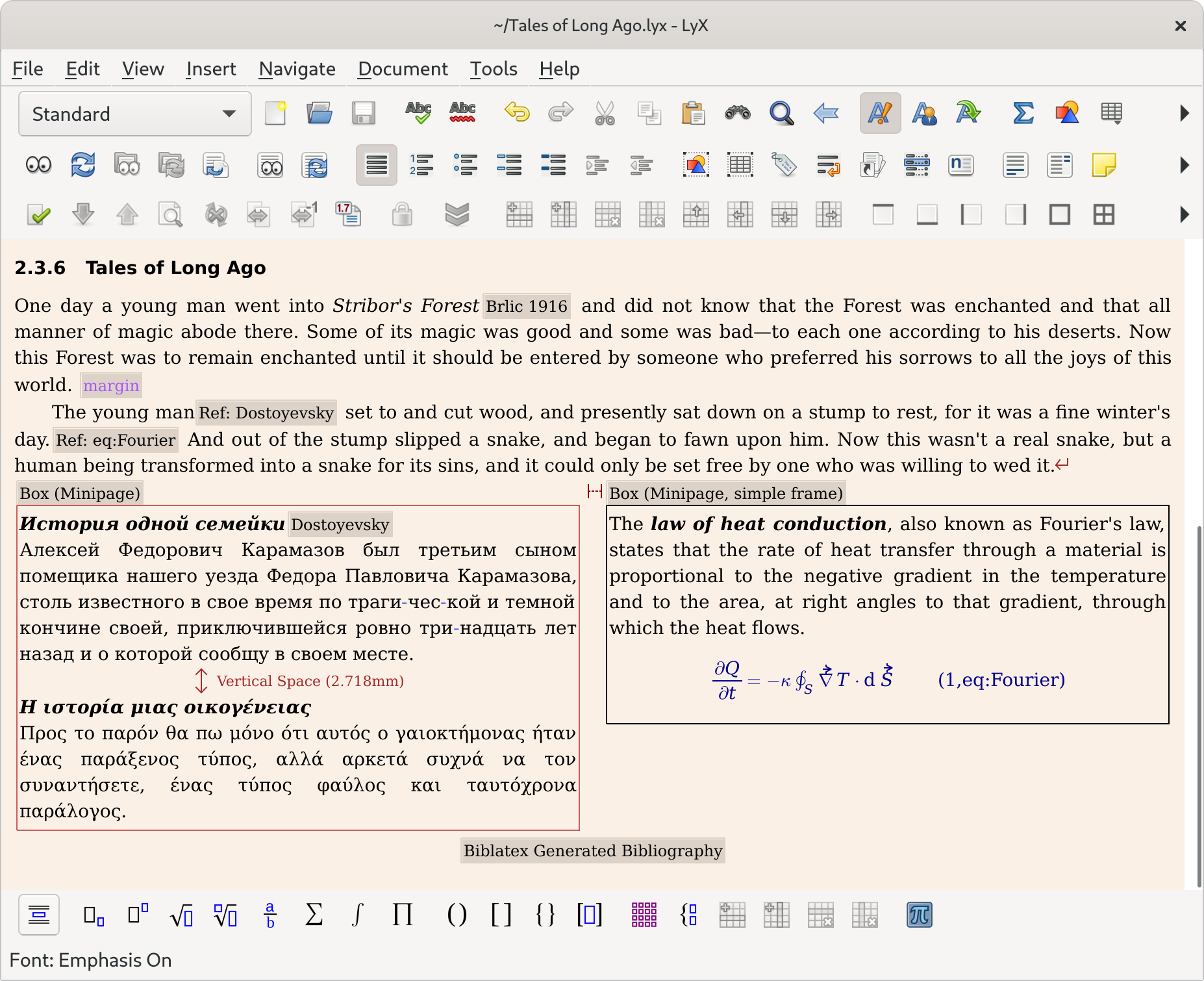
- Screenshot of LyX 2.3.6 on Linux
- Developer: The LyX Team
- Release: 1995; 31 years ago
- Stable release: 2.5.1 / 23 April 2026; 5 months ago
- Written in: C++, Qt
- Operating system: ChromeOS, Linux, macOS, Windows
- Available in: 25 languages
- List of languages Arabic, Basque, Brazilian Portuguese, Bulgarian, Czech, Dutch, Finnish, French, German, Hungarian, Indonesian, Interlingua, Italian, Japanese, Norwegian (Bokmål), Norwegian (Nynorsk), Polish, Portuguese, Russian, Simplified Chinese, Slovak, Spanish, Swedish, Traditional Chinese, Ukrainian
- Type: Document processor
- License: GPL-2.0-or-later
- Website: www.lyx.org
- Repository: git.lyx.org

LyX (styled as LyX; pronounced [ˈlɪks]) is an open source, graphical user interface document processor based on the LaTeX typesetting system. Unlike most word processors, which follow the WYSIWYG ("what you see is what you get") paradigm, LyX has a WYSIWYM ("what you see is what you mean") approach, where what shows up on the screen roughly depicts the semantic structure of the page and is only an approximation of the document produced by TeX.

Since LyX relies on the typesetting system of LaTeX without being a full-fledged LaTeX editor itself, it has the power and flexibility of LaTeX, and can handle documents including books, notes, theses, academic papers, letters, etc. LyX's interface is structured so that while knowledge of the LaTeX markup language is not necessary for basic usage, new LaTeX directives can be added into the document to support more complex features during editing — though not at the level of full control a full-fledged LaTeX editor can provide.

LyX is popular among technical authors and scientists for its advanced mathematical modes, though it is increasingly used by non-mathematically-oriented scholars as well for its bibliographic database integration and its ability to manage multiple files. LyX has also become a popular publishing tool among self-publishers.

LyX is available for all major operating systems, including Windows, macOS, Linux, UNIX, ChromeOS, OS/2 and Haiku. LyX can be redistributed and modified under the terms of the GNU General Public License and is thus free software.

== Features ==
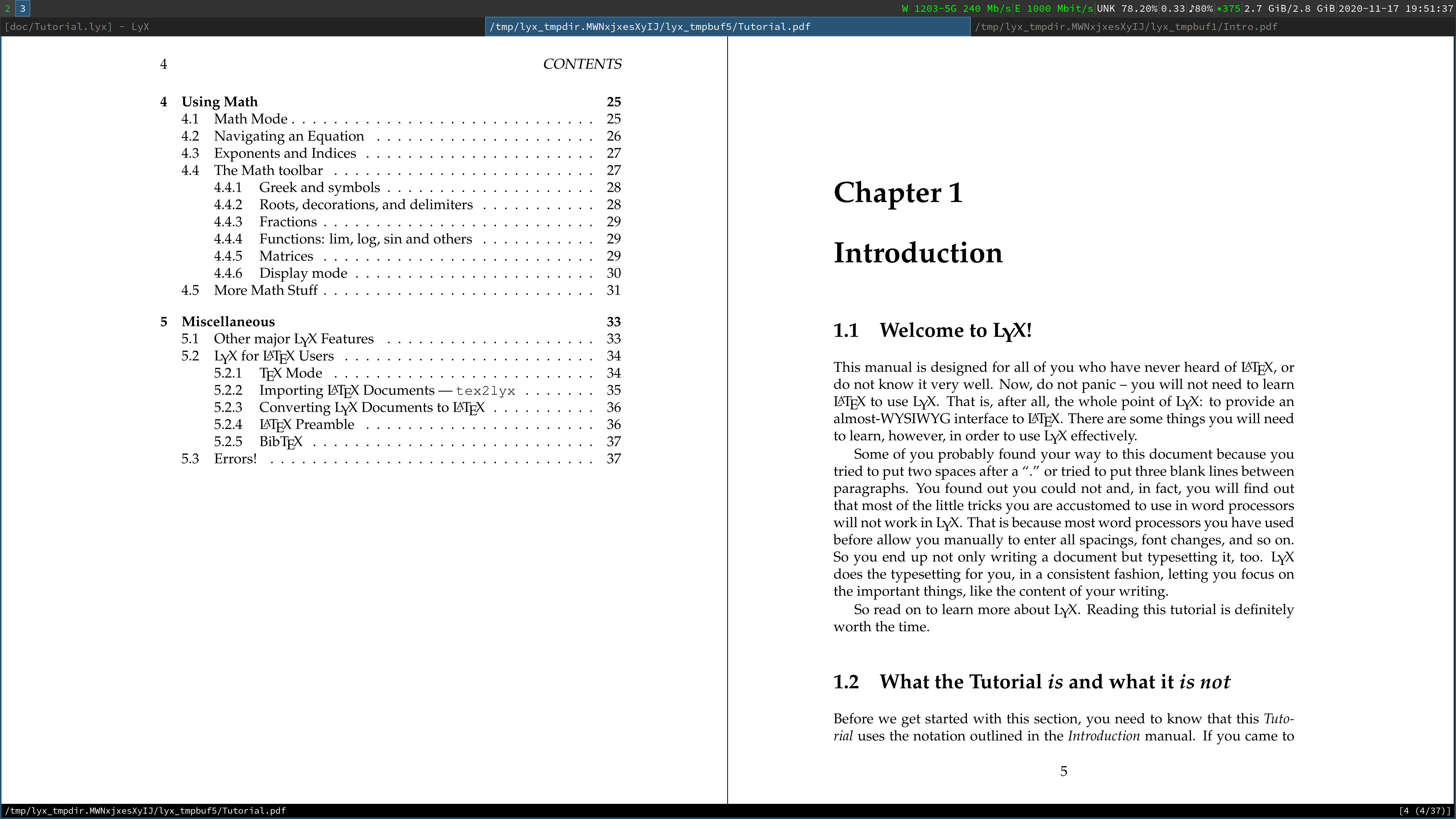
Screenshot of a PDF document created with LyX.

LyX is a full-featured document processor. It provides structured document creation and editing, branches for having different versions of the same document, master and child documents, change tracking, support for writing documents in many languages and scripts, spell checking, graphics, table editing, and automatic cross-reference (hyperlink) managing. LyX provides automatically numbered headings, titles, and paragraphs, with document outlining. It features a powerful mathematical formula editor with point-and-click or keyboard-only interface.

LyX has native support for many document classes and templates available in LaTeX through \documentclass{theclass}. User layouts and modules can be made for those missing. Text is laid out according to standard typographic rules, including ligatures, kerning, indents, spacing, and hyphenation. It provides BibTeX/BibLaTeX citation support, comprehensive cross-referencing and PDF hyperlinks. LyX can import various common text formats.

Documents can be processed in LaTeX, PdfLaTeX, XeTeX, and LuaTeX typesetting systems or exported to XHTML, DocBook, EPUB (via Docbook), and plain text. Versioning is provided through external control systems like SVN, Git, RCS, and CVS.

LyX supports right-to-left languages like Arabic, Persian, and Hebrew, along with support for bi-directional text. Chinese, Japanese, and Korean languages are also supported.

Documents can embed calculations via Octave or Computer Algebra Systems (CAS) like Maple, Maxima, and Mathematica. Commands will be forwarded to the external programs and results will be embedded in the document.

== History ==
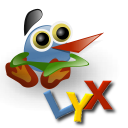
LyX's old Logo

Matthias Ettrich started developing a shareware program called Lyrix in 1995. It was then announced on Usenet, where it received a great deal of attention in the following years.

Shortly after the initial release, Lyrix was renamed to LyX due to a name clash with a word processor produced by the company Santa Cruz Operation. The name LyX was chosen because of the file suffix .lyx for Lyrix files.

== Versions ==
LyX has no set release schedule. Releases occur when there are important bug fixes or significant improvements. The following table lists the dates of all major releases. For collaboration between different users using the same major release is recommended as LyX file format remains fixed within each major release (e.g. all minor LyX versions 2.3.0, 2.3.1, 2.3.2, ... use strictly the same file format).

Version	Release date
0.7.0	24 October 1995
1.0.0	1 February 1999
1.2.0	29 May 2002
1.3.0	7 February 2003
1.4.0	8 March 2006
1.5.0	27 July 2007

Version	Release date
1.6.0	10 November 2008
2.0.0	8 May 2011
2.1.0	25 April 2014
2.2.0	26 May 2016
2.3.0	16 March 2018
2.4.0	31 May 2024
2.5.0	21 February 2026

== See also ==
- Comparison of word processors
- Comparison of TeX editors
- Comparison of desktop publishing software
- List of desktop publishing software
- List of word processors
- Scientific WorkPlace – A proprietary software (non-free) counterpart to LyX
