= TeXstudio =

Editor/IDE for LaTeX

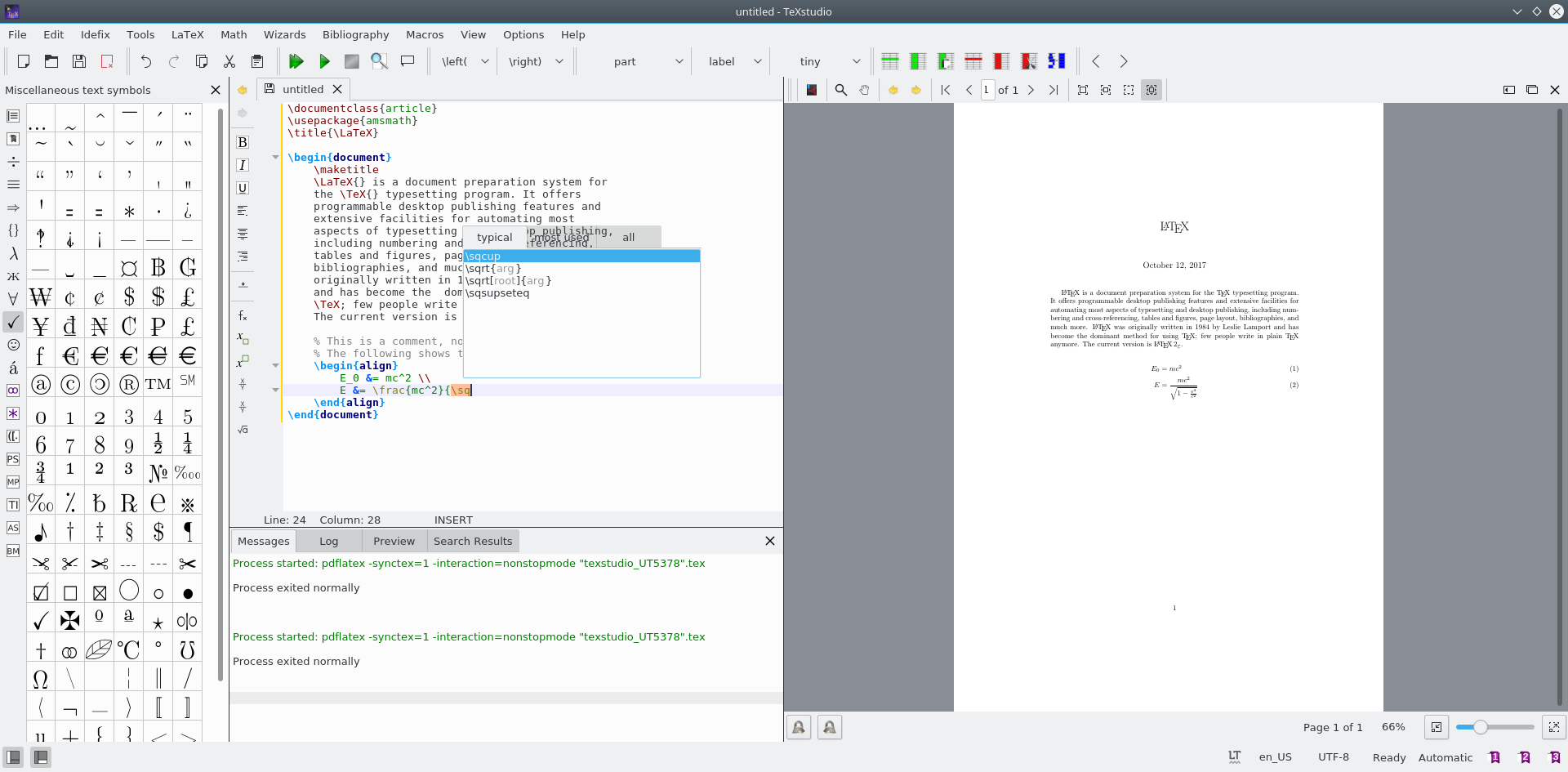
- Screenshot of TeXstudio (2.12.6) highlighting some of its features.
- Original author: Benito van der Zander
- Developers: Jan Sundermeyer, Daniel Braun, Tim Hoffmann
- Initial release: 25 September 2009
- Stable release: 4.9.0 / 7 November 2025; 3 months ago
- Written in: C++/Qt
- Operating system: Unix-like, Microsoft Windows, macOS
- Size: 23.7 MB (Microsoft Windows), 31.3 MB (Microsoft Windows USB (.zip)), 12–18 MB (Linux) (depending on the distribution), 42.7 MB (macOS), 10.5 MB (OS/2), 10.5 MB (FreeBSD), 23.2 MB (Source code)
- Available in: 11 languages
- List of languages English, French, German, Spanish, Czech, Hungarian, Italian, Russian, Ukrainian, Chinese (simplified), Brazilian Portuguese
- Type: TeX/LaTeX editor
- License: GPL-2.0-or-later
- Website: www.texstudio.org
- Repository: github.com/texstudio-org/texstudio

TeXstudio is a cross-platform open-source LaTeX editor. Its features include an interactive spelling checker, code folding, and syntax highlighting. It does not provide LaTeX itself—the user must choose a TeX distribution and install it first.

Originally called TexMakerX, TeXstudio was started as a fork of Texmaker that tried to extend it with additional features while keeping its look and feel.

== History ==
TeXstudio was forked from TeXMaker in 2008 as TeXMakerX. Changes in the fork were mainly in the editing area with code folding, syntax highlight, text selection by column, and multiple text selections. The project was initially named TeXmakerX, starting off as a small set of extensions to TeXmaker with a possibility that the additions could be merged back into the original project.

The first release of TexMakerX was released in February 2009 on SourceForge. Collaborating on the SourceForge community web site reflected a preference different from the original TeXMaker development community, who maintain an independent hosting site.

In August 2010, concerns were raised about potential confusion between the newer TeXMakerX project on SourceForge, and the older TeXMaker project at xm1math.net. In June 2011, the project was renamed as TeXstudio.

The TeXstudio community acknowledges that "TeXstudio originates from Texmaker", but "significant changes in features and the code base have made it to a fully independent program".

== See also ==
- Comparison of TeX editors
