= Texmaker =

Cross-platform LaTeX editor

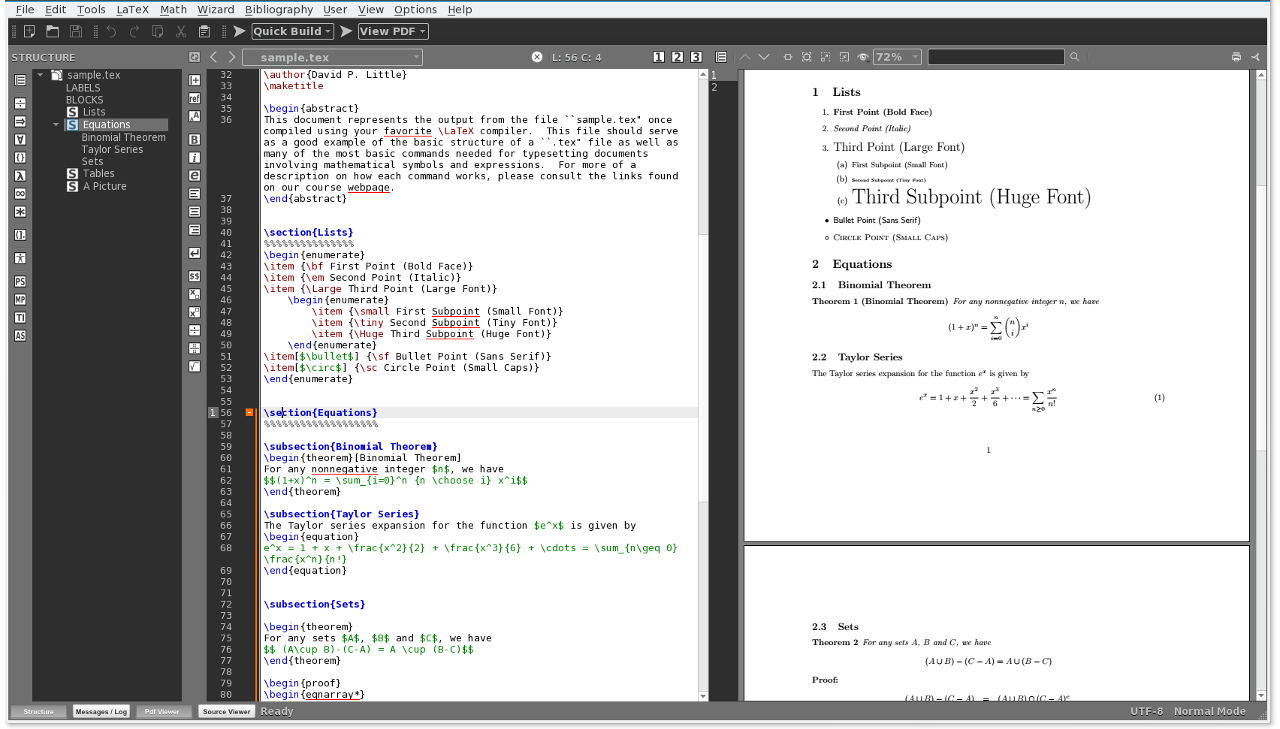
- The graphical user interface of TeXmaker
- Original author: Pascal Brachet
- Release: 29 May 2003; 23 years ago
- Stable release: 6.0.2 / 11 August 2026; 23 days ago
- Written in: C++ in Qt 6
- Operating system: Linux; Windows 10 or later macOS 11 or later
- Size: 106 MB (Windows); 9.8 MB (Debian); 214 MB (MacOS)
- Available in: 18 languages
- List of languages Brazilian Portuguese, Chinese (simplified), Chinese (traditional), Czech, Dutch, French, Galician, German, Greek, Hungarian, Italian, Northern Sami, Persian, Polish, Portuguese, Russian, Serbian, Spanish
- Type: LaTeX editor
- License: GPL-2.0-or-later
- Website: www.xm1math.net/texmaker/

Texmaker is a free and open-source LaTeX editor with an integrated PDF viewer compatible with Linux, macOS, and Windows. Written entirely as a Qt app, it features many tools needed to develop documents with LaTeX.

== Features ==
The editor includes full Unicode support, inline spell checking, auto-completion, code folding and rectangular block selection. Regular expressions are also supported for the find-and-replace actions.

Texmaker includes wizards for the following tasks:

- Generate a new document or a letter or a tabular environment.
- Create tables, tabulars, figure environments, and so forth.
- Export a LaTeX document via TeX4ht (HTML or ODT format).

Some of the LaTeX tags and mathematical symbols can be inserted in one click and users can define an unlimited number of snippets with keyboard triggers.

Texmaker automatically locates errors and warnings detected in the log file after a compilation.

The integrated PDF viewer supports continuous, rotation and presentation mode. Direct and reverse synchronization between source TeX files and the resulting PDF file is supported via the SyncTeX support.

The Asymptote graphics language is also fully supported by Texmaker (for both editing and compilation).

== See also ==
- Comparison of TeX editors
- TeXstudio (originally a fork of Texmaker, previously known as TeXmakerX)
