= TeX Live =

Distribution of TeX and related software

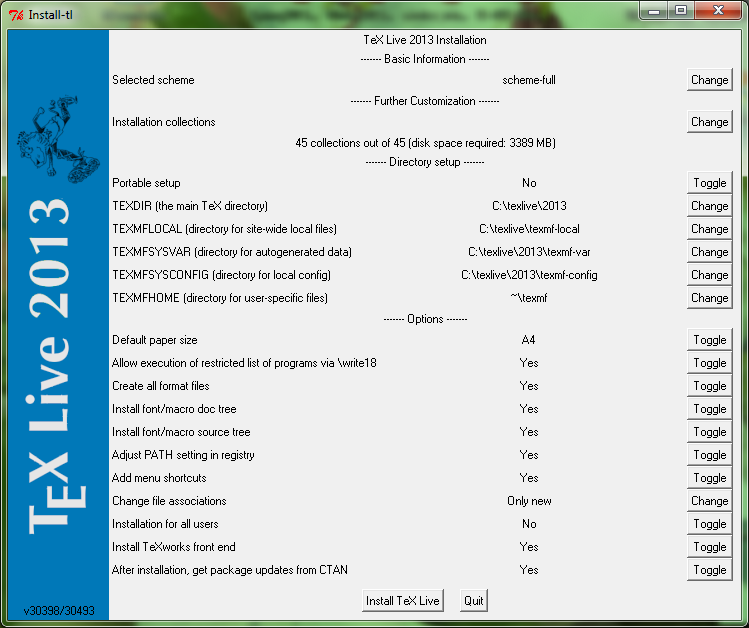
- Original author: TeX Users Group
- Developer: Karl Berry
- Initial release: 1996
- Stable release: 2026 / 1 March 2026; 4 days ago
- Operating system: FreeBSD, Linux, macOS, NetBSD, Solaris, Windows
- Predecessor: teTeX
- Available in: English, Czech/Slovak, French, German, Italian, Japanese, Korean, Polish, Russian, Serbian, Simplified Chinese
- Type: TeX distribution
- License: LaTeX Project Public License (LPPL), GPL (Version 2)
- Website: www.tug.org/texlive/
- Repository: www.tug.org/svn/texlive/

TeX Live is a cross-platform, free software distribution for the TeX typesetting system that includes major TeX-related programs, macro packages, and fonts. It is the replacement of its no-longer supported counterpart teTeX. It is now the default TeX distribution for several Linux distributions such as openSUSE, Fedora, Debian, Slackware, Ubuntu, Termux and Gentoo. Other Unix operating systems like OpenBSD, FreeBSD and NetBSD have also converted from teTeX to TeX Live.

The project was originally started by Sebastian Rahtz in 1996 in collaboration with the TeX user groups worldwide, including the TeX Users Group. Today, it is maintained by Karl Berry, Norbert Preining, Akira Kakuto, Luigi Scarso and many other people.

Up to version 2009, TeX Live could be run directly, or "live", from a CD-ROM, from a DVD-ROM, or from any other mobile device, hence its name. As of TeX Live 2010, it was no longer possible to run the distribution from the TeX Collection DVD due to restrictions in storage space. TeX Live follows the TeX Directory Structure.

Since the 2009 release, the editor TeXworks is included for Microsoft Windows, as well as the vector graphics language Asymptote.

For macOS there is MacTeX, which comprises the full TeX Live distribution as well as some additional tools for using TeX on the Mac, most notably the editor TeXShop and the bibliography manager BibDesk. Similar to Basic MikTeX in MikTeX, a substantially smaller download, BasicTeX, can also be used for Mac as well. TeX Live can also be compiled and installed through MacPorts or Homebrew.

== Release history ==
Legend:
Unsupported
Latest version
Future version

Version	Release date	Significant changes
2026	1 March 2026	HiTeX exclusively uses UTF-8 input encoding.
2025	8 March 2025	Generate PDF-1.7 in all formats, both plain and LaTeX; before, it was 1.5.
2024	12 March 2024	
2023	19 March 2023	Windows version starts and only provides 64-bit binaries.
2022	4 April 2022	
2021	1 April 2021	
2020	10 April 2020	
2019	19 April 2019	New interface for TeX Live Manager.
2018	28 April 2018	Case-insensitive file name matching on Unix by default. LaTeX default input encoding now UTF-8.
2017	4 June 2017	LuaTeX 1.04.
2016	5 June 2016	LuaTeX 0.90.
2015		LaTeX2e now include fixes previously found in fixltx2e. LuaTeX 0.80.
2014		
2013		XeTeX now uses HarfBuzz for font layout. LuaTeX 0.77.
2012		MorphOS port
2011		biber added. LuaTeX 0.70.
2010		Automatic EPS conversion for pdfTeX. PDF 1.5 output by default. XeTeX have margin kerning. LuaTeX 0.60. Can no longer be run live from a DVD.
2009		TeXworks included in Windows and OSX ports. Asymptote included. LuaTeX 0.40.
2008		Incremental updates over the internet. First release with LuaTeX.
2007		First release with XeTeX.
2005		
2004		New folder structure.
2003		e-TeX as default. Latin Modern included.
7	2002	Mac OS X support
6	July 2001	Finegrained collections.
5	March 2000	Removed all non-free software.
4	1999	Windows support. Web2C 7.3.
3	1998	Web2C 7.2.
2	1997	
1	May 1996	

== See also ==
- MiKTeX
