= Microtypography =

Improving the readability and appearance of text

Microtypography is a range of methods for improving the readability and appearance of text, especially justified text. The methods reduce the appearance of large interword spaces and create edges to the text that appear more even. Microtypography methods can also increase reading comprehension of text, reducing the cognitive load of reading.

== Aims ==
The primary aim of Microtopography is to improve the reading experience by making text appear visually even, comfortable and unobtrusive. Rather than simple enhancing the appearance of the page, microtypographic adjustment optimise the spacing and relationship between the letters, words and lines so that readers can concentrate on the content with minimal distraction. This fine tunings help to create a consistent typographic "colour", reduce distracting artefacts such as uneven spacing and rivers in justified text and balanced competing objectives including minimising hyphenation while maintaining even word spacing. Although microtypography is often associated with justified composition many techniques including kerning, tracking, optical margin alignment and OpenType features, also improve the quality and readability of ragged right text.

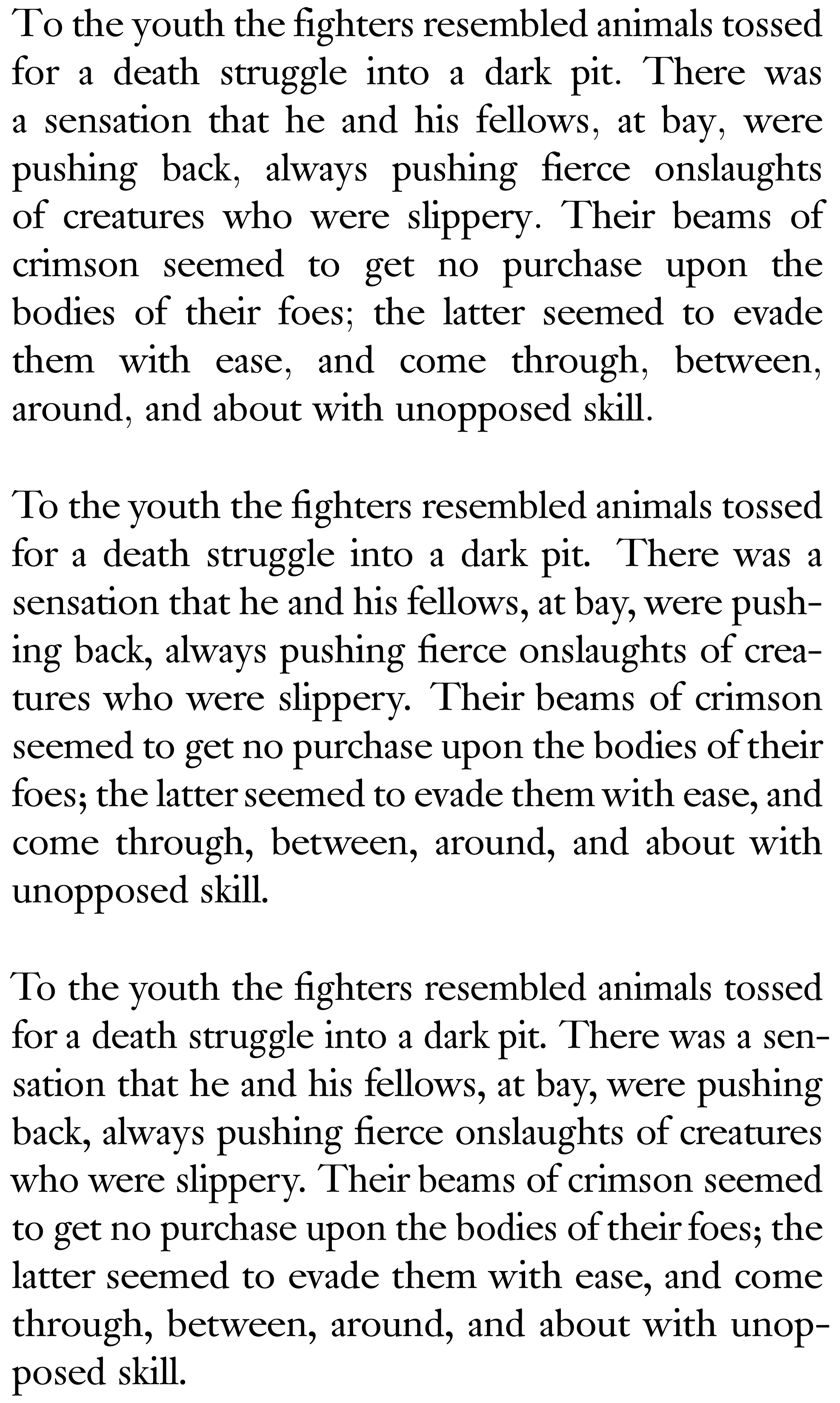
Three images of a paragraph from The Red Badge of Courage (Stephen Crane, 1895) to illustrate kerning, ligatures, hyphenation and microtypography (expansion/protrusion). Top: none; middle: kerning/ligatures/hyphens; bottom: all.

== Methods ==
Several methods can be used.

- These methods are sometimes called expansion. Robert Bringhurst suggests about 3% expansion or contraction of intercharacter spacing and about 2% expansion or contraction of glyphs as the largest permissible deviations. Compare the use of Kashida in Persian typography.
- Glyphs that are small (such as a period) or round (such as the letter "o") at the end of a line can be extended beyond the end of the line to create a more even line at the edge of the text. This is called protrusion, margin kerning, or hanging punctuation.
- Multiple different versions of the same glyph with different widths may be used. This method was used by Gutenberg in the 42-line bible, but is less easy now because few fonts come with multiple versions of the same glyph. It is not practical with narrow variants of a font or with different weights of a font because the glyphs look too different from each other to create good effect. It is possible with some multiple master fonts.
- The interline space can be adjusted in a similar way to the interword space to create text blocks of identical height or to avoid widows and orphans. However, this practice (sometimes called vertical justification) is frowned upon in quality typography, as it destroys the fabric of the text.
- The tracking (interletter, as opposed to interword, space) can be increased or decreased.
- The width of glyphs can be increased or decreased.
- The width of the word spaces can be increased or decreased. Word spacing can be adjusted uniformly across a block of text or variably with different sized spaces used between different words. The variable adjustment method is often called syntactic cueing, phrase-based formatting, or chunking when expansions or contractions are varied to group multiple words into units of meaning such as phrases or clauses. Chunking words by visually grouping them through word spacing or other white space improves reading comprehension, speed, and verbal fluency 10–40%.

The following methods are not usually considered part of microtypography, but are important to it.

- A hyphenation method that can break words at an appropriate point if necessary.
- Justification of text. If the text is not justified, the word spacing is fixed, so only the protrusion elements of microtypography are likely to be useful.
- Kerning helps ensure that the space between letters is appropriate before microtypography is applied.

== Availability ==
Adobe InDesign provides microtypography and is based on the Hz-program developed by Hermann Zapf and Peter Karow. As of August 2007, InDesign is available for Apple Mac OS X and Microsoft Windows operating systems.

Scribus provides limited microtypography in the form of glyph extensions and optical margins. It is available for Windows, Mac OS X, Linux, various BSD flavours, and others.

The pdfTeX extension of TeX, developed by Hàn Thế Thành, incorporates microtypography. It is available for most operating systems. As of June 2022, pdfTeX is not fully compatible with XeTeX, an extension of TeX that makes it easier to use many typographic features of OpenType fonts (in 2010, support for protrusion was added to it.). pdfTeXs microtypography extensions are almost fully supported (except for the adjustment of interword spacing and of kerning) with LuaTeX, yet another extension of TeX which offers all of the benefits of XeTeX (and some others). For LaTeX, the microtype package provides an interface to the pdfTeX microtypographic extensions; ConTeXt, another typesetting system based on TeX, offers both microtypographical features such as expansion and protrusion (a.k.a. hanging punctuation) and OpenType support through LuaTeX.

Heirloom troff, an OpenType-compatible (and open-source) version of UNIX troff, supports protrusion, kerning and tracking.

The word-processing packages OpenOffice.org Writer and Microsoft Word do not, as of August 2015, support microtypography. They allow pair kerning and have limited support for ligaturing, but automatic ligaturing is not available.

GNU TeXmacs supports microtypography features such as expansion, protrusion, kerning and tracking.

Typst supports multiple features of microtypography. These include expansion, contraction and hanging punctuation.

Author Robin Williams suggests methods for achieving protrusion with word processors and desktop publishing packages that do not make it directly available.
