= MetaType1 =

MetaType1, also stylized as METATYPE1, is a tool for creating Type 1 fonts using MetaPost, developed by the Polish JNS team (Bogusław Jackowski, Janusz Marian Nowacki and Piotr Strzelczyk).

Since Metafont cannot produce outline fonts (vector-based), a new tool was needed to help creating such fonts, primarily for use with TeX, although the OpenType versions of the fonts might be used in any other program. It is less powerful than Metafont since no pens can be used, only filled paths, but it still allows creation of parametric fonts.

Most important fonts produced with MetaType1 are: Latin Modern, Latin Modern Math, TeX Gyre, Antykwa Toruńska, Antykwa Półtawskiego, Kurier and Iwona.
