= TeX font metric =

Font file format

- Filename extension: .tfm
- Internet media type: application/x-tex-tfm (unofficial)
- Developed by: Donald E. Knuth
- Type of format: font metric

TeX font metric (TFM) is a font file format used by the TeX typesetting system. It is a font metric format, not an outline font format like TrueType, because it provides only the information necessary to typeset the font such as each character's width, height and depth. The actual glyphs are stored elsewhere. This is not unique to TeX; Adobe's AFM files and Windows' PFM (NTF on modern Windows PostScript driver) files use the same technique.

TFM files contain all of the information TeX needs to produce its device-independent (DVI) output. The actual glyphs are then inserted by the eventual DVI output driver or previewer, using, for instance, TrueType fonts, or fonts in the bitmap PK format derived from a METAFONT source. The format is designed to be extremely compact: in the original Computer Modern distribution, every font's TFM file is smaller than 2 kB.

== Specification ==
The canonical specification of the TFM format is embedded in the source code of the program TFtoPL.

A TFM file is broken down into a series of four-byte words, which can contain data fields of various lengths. Any data fields that are more than one byte long are held in big endian order. (The exact same file will be generated, regardless of architecture of the computer generating it.)

The six-word (24-byte) file header contains twelve unsigned 16-bit integers which describe the length of the file, the range of character codes contained in the font, and the size of each of the tables. A single TFM file describes between 0 and 256 characters, inclusive.

The body of the TFM file consists of a series of ten tables, each one except for the first laid out as an array of fixed-length fields. A 32-bit signed fixed-point number with 12 bits to the left of the decimal point, referred to as a fix_word, is used heavily. The first table, header, contains a checksum designed to prevent a document compiled into a DVI with one set of fonts from being printed with a different set, as well as ASCII descriptions of the character coding scheme (e.g., ASCII or TeX text) and the font family. It also contains the font's design size; all following fix_word values are interpreted as multiplication factors for this.

File structure of a TFM file

The next table, char_info, consists of one word per character, and contains indexes into the width, height, depth and italic correction tables. This is a device to save space, because width values, for instance, are frequently duplicated. Because height and depth values are duplicated more frequently, to fit all of these values into a single word, the indexes are limited to four bits. Because of this, there is a limit of sixteen different character heights and sixteen different character depths in any given TFM file. Also, there is a limit of sixty-four different italic corrections. There is also one more index which can point into the lig_kern table, or to information about extensible characters, depending on a two-bit tag value. Extensible characters use a series of repeated characters to construct a single large one of arbitrary size, usually large delimiters such as parentheses or brackets.

There then follow the four tables width, height, depth and italic, which contain values (in fix_word format) referred to by indexes in char_info.

Ligatures and kerning are represented using a simple programming language consisting of fixed-length four-byte operations in the lig_kern table; it makes use of kerning values (specified as fix_words) in the kern table, which follows it.

Extensible characters are specified in the exten table, using a series of four-byte words specifying the top, middle, bottom and repeated sections of an extensible character. For instance, the character at left below would be obtained by setting (top, mid, bot, rep) to the character codes for (/, <, \, |). The first three character codes can be set to zero. For instance, if mid were set to 0 in the previous example, the result would change from the brace drawn at left to the parenthesis drawn to its right.

/     /
|     |
|     |
<     |
|     |
|     |
\     \

Of course, the font would use specially designed characters for this, instead of reusing existing ones, but the principle is the same.

The final table, param, contains a series of specifically defined fix_word values, including the font's x-height and the amount of italic slant (to determine how far to shift accents). Certain coding schemes such as TeX math symbols and TeX math extension define extra parameters which appear after these.

== Property lists ==
There is a human-readable equivalent to the TFM format called PL, for property list. There is an exact correspondence between a TFM file and a PL file: one can be freely converted to the other and back again with no loss of information using the tftopl and pltotf programs. The PL format, optimized for usability instead of space, does not make the same use of references that the TFM format does. For instance, many characters in a font may use the same character width, which would be represented only once in the TFM format, and this value would be referenced by each character, since the index would be significantly smaller than the full-precision numerical value. In the PL format, however, the full value is written out each time it appears.

For example, this is the code for the upper-case letter Y in Computer Modern Roman, ten point:

 (CHARACTER C Y
    (CHARWD R 0.750002)
    (CHARHT R 0.683332)
    (CHARIC R 0.025)
    (COMMENT
       (KRN C e R -0.083334)
       (KRN C o R -0.083334)
       (KRN C r R -0.083334)
       (KRN C a R -0.083334)
       (KRN C A R -0.083334)
       (KRN C u R -0.083334)
       )
    )

The kerning values seen here are copied from another section of the PL file in order to make it easier to read, which in itself is redundant. Notice how the full numeric values of the kerning constants are written out each time they appear, instead of being stored once and referred to by a much smaller index.
