= Hz-program =

Typographic composition computer program

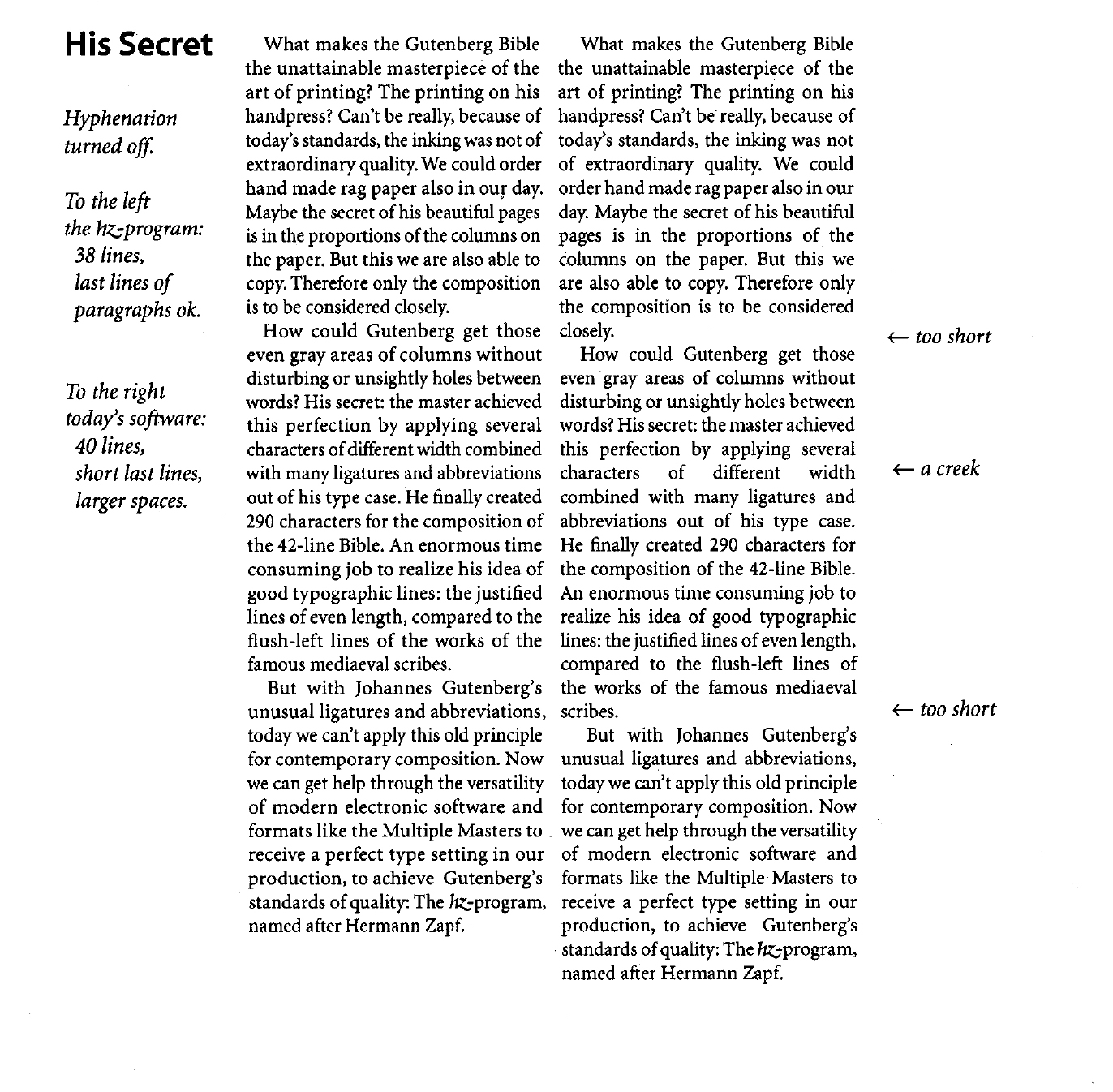
Output of the hz-program

Hz-program (German: hz-Programm) was a proprietary, patented typographic composition computer program, created by German typeface designer Hermann Zapf. The goal of this program was: "To produce the perfect grey type area without the rivers and holes of too-wide word spacing."

== History ==
In a 1993 essay, Zapf explained the history of Hz-program, which included work at Harvard University prior to his current work at the Rochester Institute of Technology, the first university in the world to establish a chair for research and development on the basic structures of typographic computer programs. He cited the development of the Macintosh as a big step:

... in 1984 Steve Jobs with his Macintosh started in a completely new direction. New software was needed, and typographic presentation on the screen could be more varied and easier to handle. The possibility of getting various typefaces without any big investment enlarged the typographic palette very quickly in the following years. More and more quality was wanted, and plenty of computer space was now available and cheap for everybody. Software was offered for all kinds of solutions from many new companies. This was the time formed to begin work again on a high-level typographic computer program. People now took such ideas seriously and not just as the dreams of a perfectionist. What was tailored at RIT in the seventies has been refined in a final version together with URW in Hamburg since 1988. Our goal was to include all the digital developments available.

== How it works ==
Little is known about the composition algorithm created by Zapf and implemented in Hz-program; in the same essay, Zapf stated it is "partly based on a typographically acceptable expansion or condensing of letters, called scaling. Connected with this is a kerning program, which calculates kerning values at 100 pairs per second. The kerning is not limited only to negative changes of space between two critical characters, but also allows in some cases positive kerning, which means the addition of space."

The Hz-program was patented by URW (the patent expired in July 2010). Later, it was acquired by Adobe Systems for inclusion as the composition engine in Adobe InDesign application. It is not known if the Hz-program algorithm is still included in latest releases of InDesign.

According to Zapf, Hàn Thế Thành made a detailed analysis of the Hz-program for microtypography extensions to the TeX typesetting system and implemented them in pdfTeX. These are available as part of the LaTeX and ConTeXt typesetting packages.

== Myth ==
The quality of the text composition produced by Hz-program, together with the lack of details of its inner working, created some mythology about it. Zapf greatly contributed to this, claiming to have reached the same level as Johannes Gutenberg. The particular technique of condensing and expanding characters (glyph scaling) which is an essential part of the Hz-program, and which is now an option in Adobe InDesign and pdfTeX, has aroused critique from well-known designers like Ari Rafaeli. Typographer Torbjørn Eng has raised serious doubts about the validity of referencing the glyph scaling to Gutenberg.
