= Omega (TeX) =

Omega is an extension of the TeX typesetting system that uses the Basic Multilingual Plane of Unicode. It was authored by John Plaice and Yannis Haralambous after TeX development was frozen in 1991, primarily to enhance TeX's multilingual typesetting abilities. It includes a new 16-bit font encoding for TeX, as well as fonts (omlgc and omah) covering a wide range of alphabets.

At the 2004 TeX Users Group conference, Plaice announced his decision to split off a new project (not yet public), while Haralambous continued to work on Omega proper.

LaTeX for Omega is invoked as lambda.

== Aleph and LuaTeX ==
Although the project seemed very promising from the beginning, the development has been slow and the functionality rather unstable. A separate project was started with the goal of stabilizing the code and extending it with e-TeX functionality, known as Aleph, and led by Giuseppe Bilotta.

The LaTeX for Aleph is known as Lamed.

Aleph alone is not being developed any more, but most of its functionality has been integrated into LuaTeX, a new project initially funded by Colorado State University (through the Oriental TeX Project by Idris Samawi Hamid) and NTG. LuaTeX started in 2006 and released the first beta version in Summer 2007. It will be a successor of both Aleph and pdfTeX, using Lua as an integrated lightweight programming language. It is developed primarily by Taco Hoekwater.

== See also ==
- XeTeX and LuaTeX for recent Unicode capable TeX extensions.
- List of TeX extensions
