= Sumihiri =

Transliteration scheme

Sumihiri is a transliteration scheme that enables writing Sinhala language text using the English alphabet. A number of tools are available to convert text written using sumihiri to Sinhala script, if desired.

== History ==
Sumihiri was developed for a project that allowed typesetting Sinhala documents using the LaTeX Document Preparation System. That project involved creating a Sinhala font using Metafont and tools that converted text written in sumihiri into TeX commands that print the corresponding Sinhala script. A paper published in 1995 described the rules of sumihiri.ජලය

== Design Criteria of sumihiri ==
The design of sumihiri was guided by the following principles:

1. It must be possible to write any modern Sinhala word without ambiguity.
2. As far as possible, common conventions that are being used to write Sinhala names using English keyboard must be retained.
3. It must be rather easy and effortless to write for someone familiar with the standard English keyboard.
4. It must be possible to read and correctly pronounce text written using 'sumihiri'.
5. Typing must be kept to a minimum.

Design of sumihiri tries to achieve the above, sometimes conflicting, goals.

== Base Letters ==
'sumihiri' distinguishes between the two 'ම' letters in the Sinhala word 'මම'. This is to facilitate correct pronouncing of text written using 'sumihiri'. The first 'ම', which has an 'open' sound is written as 'ma', whereas the second 'ම', which has a 'closed' sound is written as 'me'. Although this will have no effect in printing applications (both print the letter 'ම'), it is highly recommended to stick to this usage.

Most of the base letters are obtained in an obvious way (note that 'e' could be used instead of 'a' to print the same letter):

ka - ක, ga - ග, ja - ජ, ta - ට, da - ඩ, na - න, pa - ප, ba - බ, ma - ම, ya - ය, ra - ර, la - ල, wa - ව, sa - ස, ha - හ

Some require two letters:

cha - ච, tha - ත, dha - ද, sha - ශ

A capitalized version is used for 'මහප්‍රාණ' letters:

Ka - ඛ, Cha - ඡ, Ga - ඝ, Tha - ථ, Dha - ධ, Pa - ඵ, Ba - භ

Nasal letters:

Nga - ඟ, Nda - ඬ, Ndha - ඳ, Mba - ඹ

Some others:

La - ළ, Na - ණ, Sha - ෂ, xa - ක්‍ෂ‍, qa - ඤ, GNa - ඥ

== Special Letters ==
NG - ං, H - ඃ

== Vowel Sounds ==
Short vowel sounds are as follows:

a - අ, z - ඇ, i - ඉ, u - උ, E - එ, o - ඔ

Long vowel sounds are as follows:

aa - ආ, zz - ඈ, ii - ඊ, uu - ඌ, ee - ඒ, oo - ඕ

Some remarks are in order: In a radical approach, sumihiri uses the English letter 'z' to represent the 'ඇ' vowel sound. Not only is 'z' easy to type frequently but it also resembles the decoration 'ඇදපිල්ල' to some extent. Alternative transliteration schemes tend to use the two letter combination 'ae' for the same purpose. In those schemes, the corresponding longer vowel is represented with the letter combination 'ei', whereas in sumihiri, it is 'zz' which follows the rule of duplicating the letter to get the longer vowel. Thus the 'sumihiri' convention implies less effort in typing, too. The other remark concerns the use of 'E' for the 'එ' sound. 'E' is used for this as we have used the 'e' to indicate the closed 'අ' sound (see above). However, the corresponding long vowel sound is still indicated by 'ee'.

Furthermore, the following vowel sounds exist:

 ai - ඓ, au - ඖ

== Other Letters ==
Other forms of Sinhala letters are created by combining vowel sounds with the base letters.

=== Example ===
Here is a complete example of sumihiri usage to create various forms of the letter 'ක':

 k - ක්, ka/ke - ක, kaa - කා, kz - කැ, kzz - කෑ, ki - කි, kii - කී, ku - කු, kuu - කූ,
 kE - කෙ, kee - කේ, ko - කො, koo - කෝ, kai - කෛ, kau - කෞ

== Repaya, Yansaya and Rakaransaya ==
=== Example ===
 Rke - ර්‍ක, kYe - ක්‍ය, kRe - ක්‍ර

In general, any vowel sound can be associated with any consonant.
