= XyMTeX =

- Original author(s): Shinsaku Fujita (藤田眞作, Fujita Shinsaku)
- Developer(s): Shinsaku Fujita
- Initial release: 1 December 1993; 31 years ago
- Stable release: 5.06 / 1 September 2013; 12 years ago
- Platform: Multiplatform (TeX)
- Size: 15125 KB
- Type: Molecule editor
- License: LaTeX Project Public License 1.3
- Website: xymtex.com/fujitas3/xymtex/indexe.html

ΧyMTeΧ is a macro package for TeX which renders high-quality chemical structure diagrams. Using the typesetting system, the name is styled as XϒMTeX. It was originally written by Shinsaku Fujita (藤田眞作, Fujita Shinsaku). Molecules are defined by TeX markup.

== Example ==
The following code produces the image for corticosterone below.

\documentclass{letter}
\usepackage{epic,carom}
\pagestyle{empty}
\begin{document}
\begin{picture}(1000,500)
   \put(0,0){\steroid[d]{3D==O;{{10}}==\lmoiety{H$_{3}$C};{{13}}==\lmoiety{H$_{3}$C};{{11}}==HO}}
   \put(684,606){\sixunitv{}{2D==O;1==OH}{cdef}}
\end{picture}
\end{document}

Corticosterone as rendered by XyMTeX

== See also ==
- ppchTeX
- Molecule editor
- List of TeX extensions
