= Hanging punctuation =

Typographic technique

An example of hanging punctuation, on both sides of a justified paragraph.

Hanging punctuation or exdentation is a microtypographic technique of typesetting punctuation marks and bullet points, most commonly quotation marks and hyphens, further towards the edge so that they do not disrupt the ‘flow’ of a body of text or ‘break’ the margin of alignment. It is so called because the punctuation appears to hang in the margin of the text and is not incorporated into the block or column of text. It is commonly used when text is fully justified.

== History ==
The style was used by Gutenberg in the Gutenberg Bible, the first book printed in Europe.

Few desktop publishing applications allow for automatic hanging punctuation. This often requires manual intervention by the designer or typographer, or the use of drawing software which supports this feature, or the use of sophisticated typesetting tools. PdfTeX, a variant of the TeX typesetting program, has microtypographic capabilities that allow for semi-automatic hanging punctuation. Arbortext APP (formerly 3B2), QuarkXPress, Adobe InDesign, Adobe Photoshop, and Corel Ventura are desktop publishing applications which offer automatic support for hanging punctuation.

The blogging platform Medium implemented hanging quotes in 2014.

A proposal to add a hanging punctuation property to CSS was added to the W3C Working Draft in 2018. It is supported in Safari 10+.

== Related concepts ==
A related concept is optical margin alignment; letters such as W are set slightly into the margin to create an illusion of balance of white space.
