= Kashida =

Form of typographical justification used with the Arabic script

ـo

Kashida

Kashida or kasheeda (Persian: کَشِیدَه, romanized: kašīda, (Note: Transliteration based on Classical and Early New Persian (but also applies to the modern varieties of Dari and Tajik). In Modern Iranian Persian, however, this would be transliterated as kašide or kešide.) lit. 'extended' or 'stretched' or 'lengthened'), also known as tatweel or tatwīl (Arabic: تَطْوِيل, romanized: taṭwīl), is a type of justification in written Arabic scripts, in which the line connecting letters is extended. In contrast to white-space justification, which increases the length of a line of text by expanding spaces between words or individual letters, kasheeda creates justification by elongating characters at certain points. Kasheeda justification can be combined with white-space justification.

The analog in European (Latin-based) typography (expanding or contracting letters to improve spacing) is sometimes called expansion, and falls within microtypography. Kashida is considerably easier and more flexible, however, because Arabic–Persian scripts feature prominent horizontal strokes, whose lengths are accordingly flexible.

For example, al-ḥamdu and Raḥīm with and without kasheeda may look like the following:

Word	Meaning	Normal	Kasheeda
al-ḥamdu	‘praise’	الحمد	الحمــــــد
Raħīm	‘merciful’	رحيم	رحــــــيم

The terms kasheeda and tatweel can also refer to a character that represents this elongation (ـ) or to one of a set of glyphs of varying lengths that implement this elongation in a font. The Unicode standard assigns code point U+0640 ـ ARABIC TATWEEL.

The right side of this basmala contains a long kasheeda with a natural string-like curve.

The kasheeda can take a subtle downward curvature in some calligraphic styles and handwriting. However, the curvilinear stroke is not feasible for most basic fonts, which merely use a completely flat underscore-like (or string-like) stroke for kashida.

In addition to letter spacing and justification, calligraphers also use kasheeda for emphasis and as book or chapter titles. In modern Arabic mathematical notation, kasheeda appears in some operation symbols that must stretch to accommodate associated contents above or below.

Kasheeda generally only appears in one word per line, and one letter per word. Furthermore, experts recommend kasheeda only between certain combinations of letters (typically those that cannot form a ligature). Some calligraphers who were paid by the page used a large number of kasheeda in order to stretch content over more pages.

The branding of the 2022 FIFA World Cup in Qatar applies kasheeda to Latin script, connecting the bottom of the "t" and the second "a" in the host country's name.

A similar concept exists in Hebrew, where certain letters (אדהכלםרת←ﬡﬢﬣﬤﬥﬦﬧﬨ) may be stretched or elongated horizontally for the purpose of block justification in text. This is commonly used in Ktav Stam.

== See also ==
- Microtypography
- Word heaping
