= List of TeX extensions =

Extensions for the TeX typesetting system

TeX is a free typesetting system for which many extensions have been developed.

== Languages ==
- ArabTeX – adds support for Hebrew and Arabic alphabets
- FarsiTeX – adds support for Farsi
- Omega (TeX) – extends multilinguality by using the Basic Multilingual Plane of Unicode
- XeTeX – uses Unicode, adds additional fonts
- TIPA (software) – supports phonetic characters
- CTeX – Chinese TeX
- MonTeX – Mongolian LaTeX

== Science ==
- AMS-LaTeX and AMS-TeX - classes and packages developed for the American Mathematical Society; extensions of LaTeX and TeX respectively
- Chemfig - LaTeX package for drawing chemical structures
- CircuiTikZ - adds creation of electrical networks (adds on to TikZ)
- REVTeX - collection of LaTeX macros used for scientific journals
- XyMTeX - supports chemical structure diagrams
- mhchem - LaTeX extension package for typesetting chemical formulas and equations
- chemmacros - computational chemistry notation
- WIKIBOOKS LaTeX/Chemical Graphics

== Math and logic ==
- Bussproofs
- siunitx - for physics and scientific notation

== General ==
- BibTeX - adds reference management software
- ConTeXt - general-purpose document processor
- LaTeX - collection of macros written by Leslie Lamport
- LuaTeX - all internals can be accessed from Lua
- pdfTeX - outputs PDF files directly
- optex – LuaTeX format with extended plainTeX macros

== Other ==
- MusiXTeX - allows music typesetting
- Gregorio - allows typesetting of Gregorian chant
- PGF/TikZ - languages that provide vector graphics
- PSTricks - allows using PostScript drawings
- Texinfo - used for software manuals, can produce both print and Web documentation)

== See also ==
- CTAN – Comprehensive TeX Archive Network
- List of TeX typesetting software and tools
