= Runaround (typography) =

Text around an irregular shape

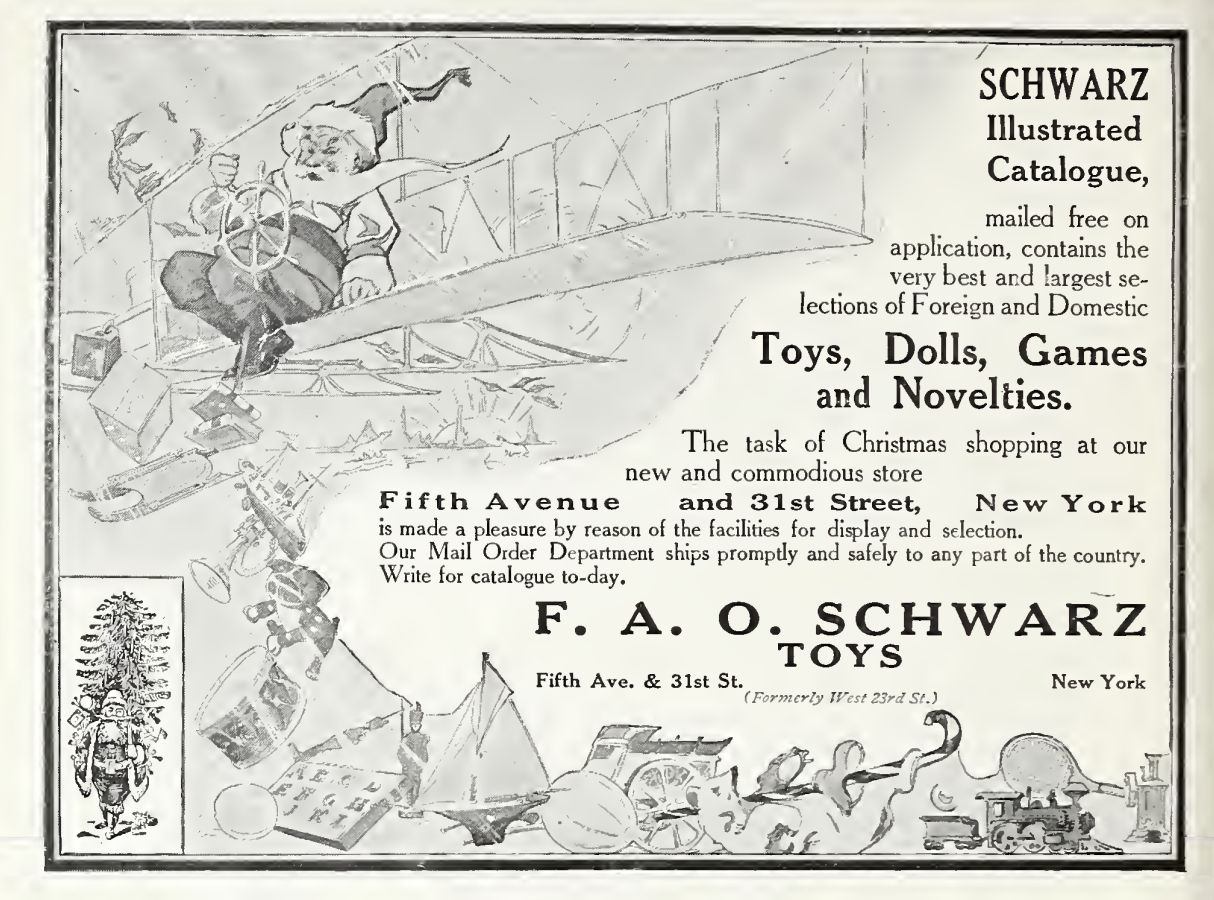
Text flowing around an image in a 1910 newspaper advertisement

In typography, a runaround is where the ends of lines of text are adjusted to conform to a box or irregular shape, rather than a simple vertical column margin. This is done where an image or other content (known as an intrusion) occupies part of a column, with the text conforming to the shape of the object.

== See also ==
- Typographic alignment
