= Mohammad Ghodsi =

- Education: Sharif University of Technology, (B.S., 1975) University of California, Berkeley, (M.S., 1978) Pennsylvania State University, (Ph.D, 1989)
- Occupation: Computer Scientist
- Years active: 1983 to present
- Known for: Project director of FarsiTeX

Mohammad Ghodsi (Persian: محمد قدسی) is an Iranian computer scientist, electrical engineer, and professor. Ghodsi is also the project director of FarsiTeX, a Persian typesetting language derived from TeX.
