= Antykwa Półtawskiego =

- Classification: Antiqua
- Designer: Adam Półtawski
- Sample

Antykwa Półtawskiego (pronounced [antɨkfa puwˈtafskʲɛɡɔ]; lit. 'Półtawski's antiqua' (Note: Antykwa Półtawskiego's author originally named it antykwa polska, meaning "Polish antiqua")) is an antiqua typeface designed by Adam Półtawski from 1923 to 1928 specifically for the Polish language.

== Digitizations ==
The Polish TeX User's Group GUST (Janusz M. Nowacki, Bogusław Jackowski and Piotr Strzelczyk) digitised Antykwa Półtawskiego using Metafont with four weights (light, normal, medium, bold), italic and upright styles, as well as specific fonts for the 6, 8, 10, 12 and 17 point optical sizes.

Most languages written in the Latin script are supported, among them all such European languages as well as some other languages such as Vietnamese and Navajo.

The Antykwa Półtawskiego fonts are available free of charge under the terms of the GUST Font License.
