= Computer Modern =

Family of serif typefaces

- Category: Serif
- Classification: Didone, Scotch Modern
- Designer: Donald Knuth
- License: SIL Open Font License
- Sample

Computer Modern is the original family of typefaces used by the typesetting program TeX. It was created by Donald Knuth with his Metafont program, and was most recently updated in 1992. Computer Modern and its variants remain very widely used in scientific publishing, especially in disciplines that make frequent use of mathematical notation.

== Design ==
Computer Modern is based on late-1800s type. Its direct inspiration, Monotype Modern, is at top; similar typefaces of the era included Century, Excelsior and Clarendon.

Computer Modern is a typeface in the Scotch Roman class, similar to Didone typefaces, having high stroke contrast (variation between thick and thin) and a vertical axis but bracketed serifs. Computer Modern was specifically based on the 10 point size of Lanston Monotype Company's Modern Extended 8A, part of a family Monotype originally released in 1896. This was one of many "modern" classes of typeface issued by typefounders around this period, and that then became standard style for body text printing in the late 19th century.

In creating the TeX publishing system, Knuth was influenced by the history of mathematics and a desire to achieve the "classic style" of books printed in metal type. "Modern" faces were used extensively for printing mathematics, especially before Times New Roman became popular for mathematics printing in the 1950s.

The most unusual characteristic of Computer Modern, however, is the fact that it is a complete type family designed with Knuth's Metafont system, one of the few typefaces developed in this way. The Computer Modern source files are governed by 62 distinct parameters, controlling the widths and heights of various elements, the presence of serifs or old-style numerals, whether dots such as the dot on the "i" are square or rounded, and the degree of "superness" in the bowls of lowercase letters such as "g" and "o". This allows Metafont designs to be processed in unusual ways; Knuth has shown effects such as morphing in demonstrations, where one font slowly transitions into another over the course of a text. While it attracted attention for the concept, Metafont has been used by few other font designers; by 1996, Knuth said that "asking an artist to become enough of a mathematician to understand how to write a font with 60 parameters is too much" while digital-period font designer Jonathan Hoefler commented in 2015 that "Knuth's idea that letters start with skeletal forms is flawed".

== Derived versions ==
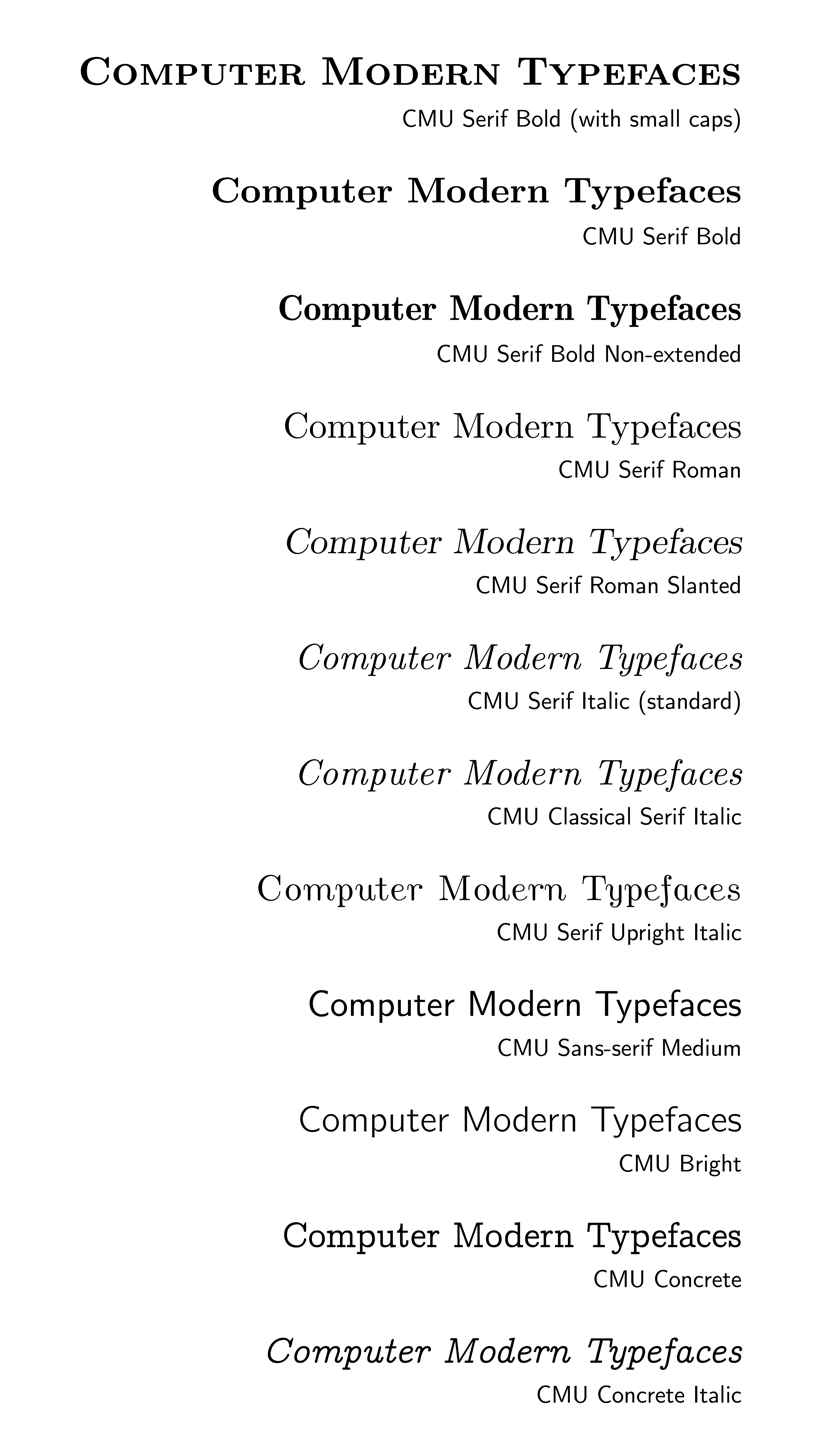
A sample gallery of many of the fonts from the CMU (Computer Modern Unicode) font family

Knuth produced his original Computer Modern fonts using Metafont, a program that reads stroke-based definitions of glyphs and outputs ready-to-use fonts as bitmap image files. He mostly left the font, as with other components of TeX (with the exception of the TeX and Metafont names themselves, a stipulation Knuth made to maintain quality control), in the public domain.

The advance of publishing technology (PostScript, PDF, laser printers) has reduced the need for bitmap fonts. The preferred formats are now outline fonts such as Type 1, TrueType, or OpenType, which can be rendered efficiently at arbitrary resolution and using sophisticated anti-aliasing techniques by printer firmware or on-screen document viewers. Therefore, several other projects have ported the Computer Modern fonts into such formats. Some of these projects have also complemented Computer Modern with

- additional characters (euro, accented characters, Cyrillic and Greek script coverage)
- different font encodings (to overcome problems with Knuth's original 8-bit character sets)
- additional font style variants

Several such derivatives are now also widely used and included in TeX Live, a modern TeX distribution.

=== CMU ===
A current extended release of the Computer Modern family in the general-purpose OpenType format is the CMU distribution (for Computer Modern Unicode):

- CMU Serif, the main Computer Modern font family. This includes the four traditional styles of font (regular, italic, bold, bold italic), and:
  - CMU Serif upright italic, an upright italic style similar to cursive upright handwriting
  - CMU Serif bold non-extended, a bold weight duplexed to have the same width as the regular style
  - CMU Serif roman and bold slanted, two oblique styles
  - CMU Classical Serif, an italic design with slightly simpler serif designs
- Concrete Roman, a slab serif font in the four standard styles
- CMU Typewriter, a typewriter-style slab serif font
- CMU Sans Serif, a complementary sans-serif font, and CMU Bright, a lighter style of the same design
  - CMU Sans demi-condensed, a condensed style of the same design

CMU is released under the SIL Open Font License.

=== BlueSky ===
Computer Modern used to set a maths formula in TeX, the font's original purpose

Computer Modern was first transformed to a PostScript Type 3 font format by BlueSky, Inc. in 1988, and then to Type 1 in 1992 to include font hinting. The Type 1 version has since then been donated to the American Mathematical Society (AMS), which distributes it freely under the Open Font License. It is found in most standard TeX distributions.

=== Latin Modern ===
The Latin Modern implementation, maintained by Bogusław Jackowski and Janusz M. Nowacki of TeX User Group Poland (GUST), is now standard in the TeX community and was made through a Metafont/MetaPost derivative called METATYPE1. It was derived from the BlueSky Type 1 fonts, which were converted back into outline-based METATYPE1 programs, from which the extended Type 1 and OpenType Latin Modern fonts were then developed. ConTeXt uses Latin Modern as default font, instead of Computer Modern.

The Type 1 to METATYPE1 to Type 1 round-trip conversion process involved in the production of the Latin Modern fonts tried to preserve the hinting information of the BlueSky fonts; however, it introduced rounding errors that affect the quality of the hinting at low pixel sizes. As a result, on-screen display of the Latin Modern fonts can result in a less even display of kerning and character heights than with the BlueSky fonts. The same process was later extended to some free PostScript font clones under the umbrella project TeX Gyre.

The Latin Modern font has also gained an OpenType math table. Unlike Computer Modern Math, Latin Modern Math has no pairwise kerning information: OpenType math rendering does not make use of this type of kerning, making such information useless.

=== New Computer Modern ===
The New Computer Modern font family is a large extension in terms of the number of additional glyphs of the Latin Modern fonts which adds support for several more languages such as Greek, Cyrillic, Hebrew, Cherokee and Coptic. This font family comes in three weights: "Regular", "Book", and "Bold". The book weight is supposed to look slightly heavier compared to the "Regular". All three weights include support for typesetting mathematics; complete coverage of Unicode math blocks is provided, along with some more glyphs needed for mathematics. Additionally, the New Computer Modern family includes sans-serif text and math fonts.

=== MLModern ===
MLModern is based on the Latin Modern font. It avoids the spindliness of most other Type 1 versions of Computer Modern, and thus appears thicker in comparison to Latin Modern or Computer Modern.

A visual comparison of Computer Modern, Latin Modern, New Computer Modern Book and MLModern is shown here.

=== Others ===
- EC fonts – look much like Computer Modern, but have slightly different metrics. These were the first TeX fonts to use the "Cork encoding" (in LaTeX also known as T1 encoding) that provides precomposed glyphs for West-European languages. The original EC fonts were only available as Metafont generated bitmaps.
- TC fonts – the TeX Companion fonts provide a number of additional symbols commonly used in text.
- BaKoMa fonts – another automatically generated Type1 version of Computer Modern by Basil K. Malyshev, dating to 1994. The fonts remain available for download after Malyshev's 2019 death.
- CM-super – a very large extension of Computer Modern, available in a variety of encodings. These fonts were automatically vectorized from Computer Modern or EC font bitmaps and therefore lack the hinting information in the BlueSky fonts.
- CM-LGC – a Latin, Greek, Cyrillic extension.

== See also ==
- STIX Fonts, a project to create Times New Roman-compatible mathematics fonts. Open-sourced under the SIL open font license.
