= FarsiTeX =

FarsiTeX /ˈfɑːrsiːtɛk/ is a free Persian/English bidirectional typesetting system based on the TeX system. The FarsiTeX project was initiated by Mohammad Ghodsi at Sharif University of Technology in 1993.

The latest (experimental) version of FarsiTeX in 2006 is released with a Windows installer, bundled with an editor and makeindex utility. The source tarball can be used on Linux and other systems as well.

It is released under the GNU GPL.

== See also ==
- ArabTeX for Arabic writing
- MonTeX for vertical, traditional Mongolian alphabet, old Uyghur and Tungus writings.
- XeTeX
- List of TeX extensions
