= ArabTeX =

Free software package providing support for the Arabic and Hebrew alphabets

The ArabTeX logo

ArabTeX is a free software package providing support for the Arabic and Hebrew alphabets to TeX and LaTeX. Written by Klaus Lagally, it can take romanized ASCII or native script input to produce quality ligatures for Arabic, Persian, Urdu, Pashto, Sindhi, Western Punjabi (Lahnda), Maghribi, Uyghur, Kashmiri, Hebrew, Judeo-Arabic, Ladino and Yiddish. ArabTeX characters are placed within a TeX/LaTeX document using the command \RL{ ... } or the environment \begin{RLtext} ... \end{RLtext}. ArabTeX is released under the LaTeX Project Public License v1+.

== Example ==
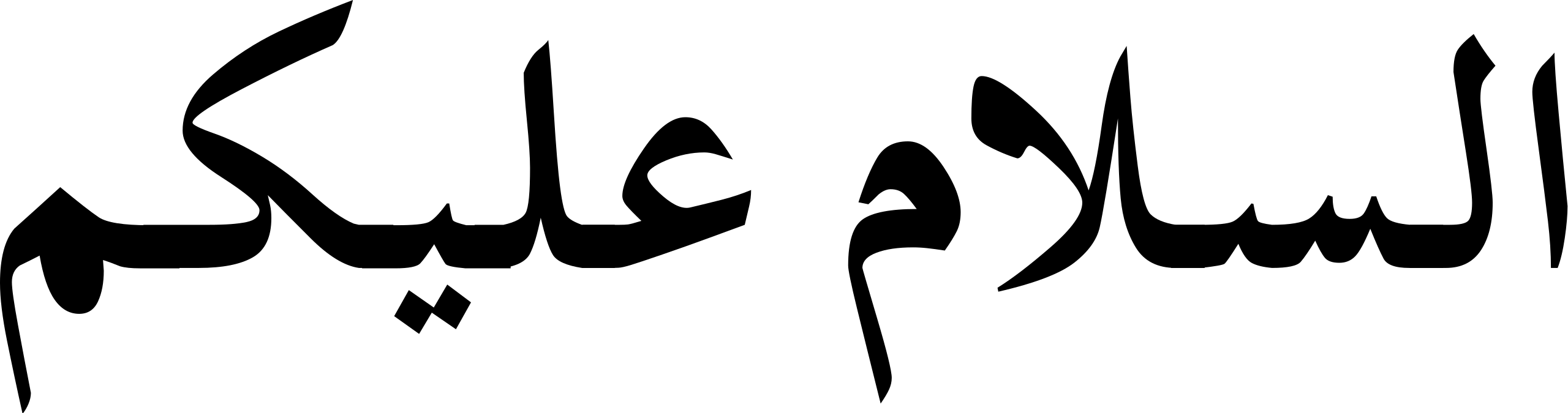

\novocalize
\RL{al-salAm `alaykum}

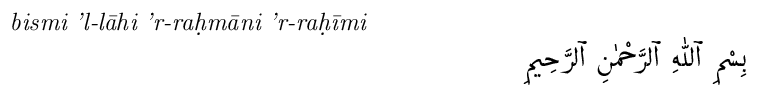

 \documentclass[12pt]{article}
 \usepackage{arabtex}
 \begin{document}
 \setarab
 \fullvocalize
 \transtrue
 \arabtrue
 \begin{RLtext}
 bismi al-ll_ahi al-rra.hm_ani al-rra.hImi
العربية
 \end{RLtext}
 \end{document}

== Common commands ==
- \setarab (set language specific rendering)
- \setfarsi (set language specific rendering)
- \setuighur (set language specific rendering)
- \set... (more language conventions, see the documentation)
- \novocalize (individual vowel marks can be displayed using "a, "i, "u)
- \vocalize (individual vowel marks can be cancelled using "a, "i, "u)
- \fullvocalize (individual vowel marks can be cancelled using "a, "i, "u)
- \setcode{ } (switch input encodings)
- \settrans{ } (switch transliteration conventions)

== Character table ==
Letter	Transliteration	Unicode name
ا	A	ARABIC LETTER ALEF
أ	a'	ARABIC LETTER ALEF WITH HAMZA ABOVE
ب	b	ARABIC LETTER BEH
ت	t	ARABIC LETTER TEH
ث	_t	ARABIC LETTER THEH
ج	j / ^g	ARABIC LETTER JEEM
ح	.h	ARABIC LETTER HAH
خ	x / _h	ARABIC LETTER KHAH
د	d	ARABIC LETTER DAL
ذ	_d	ARABIC LETTER THAL
ر	r	ARABIC LETTER REH
ز	z	ARABIC LETTER ZAIN
س	s	ARABIC LETTER SEEN
ش	^s	ARABIC LETTER SHEEN
ص	.s	ARABIC LETTER SAD
ض	.d	ARABIC LETTER DAD
ط	.t	ARABIC LETTER TAH
ظ	.z	ARABIC LETTER ZAH
ع	`	ARABIC LETTER AIN
غ	.g	ARABIC LETTER GHAIN
ف	f	ARABIC LETTER FEH
ق	q	ARABIC LETTER QAF
ك	k	ARABIC LETTER KAF
ل	l	ARABIC LETTER LAM
م	m	ARABIC LETTER MEEM
ن	n	ARABIC LETTER NOON
و	w / U	ARABIC LETTER WAW
ه	h	ARABIC LETTER HEH
ي	y / I	ARABIC LETTER YEH
َ	a	ARABIC FATHA
ُ	u / o	ARABIC DAMMA
ِ	i / e	ARABIC KASRA
پ	p	ARABIC LETTER PEH
چ	^c	ARABIC LETTER TCHEH
ژ	^z	ARABIC LETTER JEH
گ	g	ARABIC LETTER GAF
ک	.k	ARABIC LETTER KEHEH
ی	y / I^{*}	ARABIC LETTER FARSI YEH
ۀ	H-i	ARABIC LETTER HEH WITH YEH
آ	'A	ARABIC LETTER ALEF WITH MADDA ABOVE
ة	T	ARABIC LETTER TEH MARBUTA
ء	'	ARABIC LETTER HAMZA ABOVE
ئ	'y	ARABIC LETTER YEH WITH HAMZA ABOVE
ؤ	u'	ARABIC LETTER WAW WITH HAMZA ABOVE
ً	aN	ARABIC FATHATAN
ّ	xx	ARABIC SHADDA
،	,	ARABIC COMMA
؛	;	ARABIC SEMICOLON
؟	?	ARABIC QUESTION MARK
٪	%	ARABIC PERCENT SIGN
		SPACE
.	.	FULL STOP
‍	-	ZERO WIDTH JOINER
‌	\hspace{0ex}	ZERO WIDTH NON-JOINER

^* Activated by \setfarsi

Note that one can also overcome the problem with <yah> containing dots using the \yahnodots command.

== See also ==
- XePersian
- FarsiTeX
- XeTeX
- ArabLuaTex
- List of TeX extensions
