= Word heaping =

Word heaping is a technique used for text justification in Arabic script, in which one word can be placed over another to save space on the line.

== Heap ligatures in Unicode ==
Arabic Presentation Forms-A has a few characters defined as "word ligatures" for terms frequently used in formulaic expressions in Arabic. A few example ligatures that feature heaping are shown below: (Note: May not render properly without font support)

- U+FDFA ﷺ ARABIC LIGATURE SALLALLAHOU ALAYHE WASALLAM (صلى الله عليه وسلم "peace be upon him")
- U+FDFB ﷻ ARABIC LIGATURE JALLAJALALOUHOU (جل جلاله "may His glory be glorified")
- U+FDFD ﷽ ARABIC LIGATURE BISMILLAH AR-RAHMAN AR-RAHEEM (بسم الله الرحمن الرحيم "in the name of God, the Most Gracious, the Most Merciful")

== See also ==
- Word wrap
- Kashida
