= Typographic alignment =

Setting of text flow or image placement relative to a page, column, table cell, or tab

In typesetting and page layout, alignment or range is the setting of text flow or image placement relative to a page, column (measure), table cell, or tab (and often to an image above it or under it).

The type alignment setting is sometimes referred to as text alignment, text justification, or type justification. The edge of a page or column is known as a margin, and a gap between columns is known as a gutter.

== Basic variations ==
There are four basic typographic alignments:

- flush left—the text is aligned along the left margin or gutter, also known as left-aligned, ragged right or ranged left;
- flush right—the text is aligned along the right margin or gutter, also known as right-aligned, ragged left or ranged right;
- justified—text is aligned along the left margin, with letter-spacing and word-spacing adjusted so that the text falls flush with both margins, also known as fully justified or full justification;
- centered—text is aligned symmetrically along the column's center axis; the text does not fall flush along either margin;

Alignment does not change the direction in which text is read; however, text direction may determine the most commonly used alignment for that script.

Some modern typesetting programs use the word justify more broadly and label these four options as: left justify, right justify, center justify and full justify. In programs that do not offer multiple kinds of justification, typically only left (for left-to-right languages) or right (for right-to-left languages) justification is provided.

=== Flush left ===
In English and most European languages where words are read left-to-right, text is usually aligned "flush left", meaning that the text of a paragraph is aligned on the left-hand side with the right-hand side ragged. This is the default style of text alignment on the World Wide Web for left-to-right text. Quotations are often indented. Flush left might also be used in very narrow columns, where full justification would produce too much whitespace between characters or words on some lines.

The phrase "left alignment" is often used when the left side of text is aligned along a visible or invisible vertical line which may or may not coincide with the left margin. For example, if a paragraph that is flush left were indented from the left, it would no longer be aligned with the left margin setting, but it would still be left aligned.

=== Flush right ===
In other languages that read text right-to-left, such as Persian, Arabic and Hebrew, text is commonly aligned "flush right". Additionally, flush-right alignment is used to set off special text in English, such as attributions to authors of quotes printed in books and magazines, or text associated with an image to its right. Flush right is often used when formatting tables of data. It is used to align text to the right margin; in this case, the left ends will be unequal.

The term "right alignment" is frequently used when the right side of text is aligned along a visible or invisible vertical line which may or may not coincide with the right margin. For example, if a paragraph that is flush right were indented from the right, it would no longer aligned with the right margin setting, but it would still be right aligned.

=== Justified ===
A common type of text alignment in print media is "justification", where the spaces between words and between glyphs or letters are stretched or compressed in order to align both the left and right ends of consecutive lines of text. Lines in which the spaces have been stretched beyond their normal width are called loose lines, while those whose spaces have been compressed are called tight lines.

When using justification, it is customary to treat the last line of a paragraph separately by simply left or right aligning it, depending on the language direction. As opposed to this, "forced justification" keeps the last line justified, no matter its length. Some modern typesetting programs (e.g. inDesign) have specific options to align the last line of a paragraph (either to the left, the right, or even to the center).

=== Centered ===
Centered text

Text can also be "centered", or symmetrically aligned along an axis in the middle of a column. This is often used for the title of a work, headlines, and for poems and songs. As with flush-right alignment, centered text is often used to present data in tables. Centered text is considered less readable for a body of text made up of multiple lines because the ragged starting edges make it difficult for the reader to track from one line to the next.

Centered text can also be commonly found on signs, flyers, and similar documents where grabbing the attention of the reader is the main focus, or visual appearance is important and the overall amount of centered text is small.

== Examples ==
The following table displays the difference between a justified (flush left and flush right) and a flush left (and ragged right) text.

Justified (flush left and right)	Flush left, ragged right
Thy father was delighted and cried out to the servant, 'Give him a hundred and three gold pieces with a robe of honour!' The man obeyed his orders, and I awaited an auspicious moment, when I blooded him; and he did not baulk me; nay he thanked me and I was also thanked and praised by all present. When the blood-letting was over I had no power to keep silence and asked him, 'By God, O my lord, what made thee say to the servant, Give him an hundred and three dinars?'; and he answered, 'One dinar was for the astrological observation, another for thy pleasant conversation, the third for the phlebotomisation, and the remaining hundred and the dress were for thy verses in my commendation.'" "May God show small mercy to my father," exclaimed I, "for knowing the like of thee."	Thy father was delighted and cried out to the servant, 'Give him a hundred and three gold pieces with a robe of honour!' The man obeyed his orders, and I awaited an auspicious moment, when I blooded him; and he did not baulk me; nay he thanked me and I was also thanked and praised by all present. When the blood-letting was over I had no power to keep silence and asked him, 'By God, O my lord, what made thee say to the servant, Give him an hundred and three dinars?'; and he answered, 'One dinar was for the astrological observation, another for thy pleasant conversation, the third for the phlebotomisation, and the remaining hundred and the dress were for thy verses in my commendation.'" "May God show small mercy to my father," exclaimed I, "for knowing the like of thee."

== Problems with justification ==
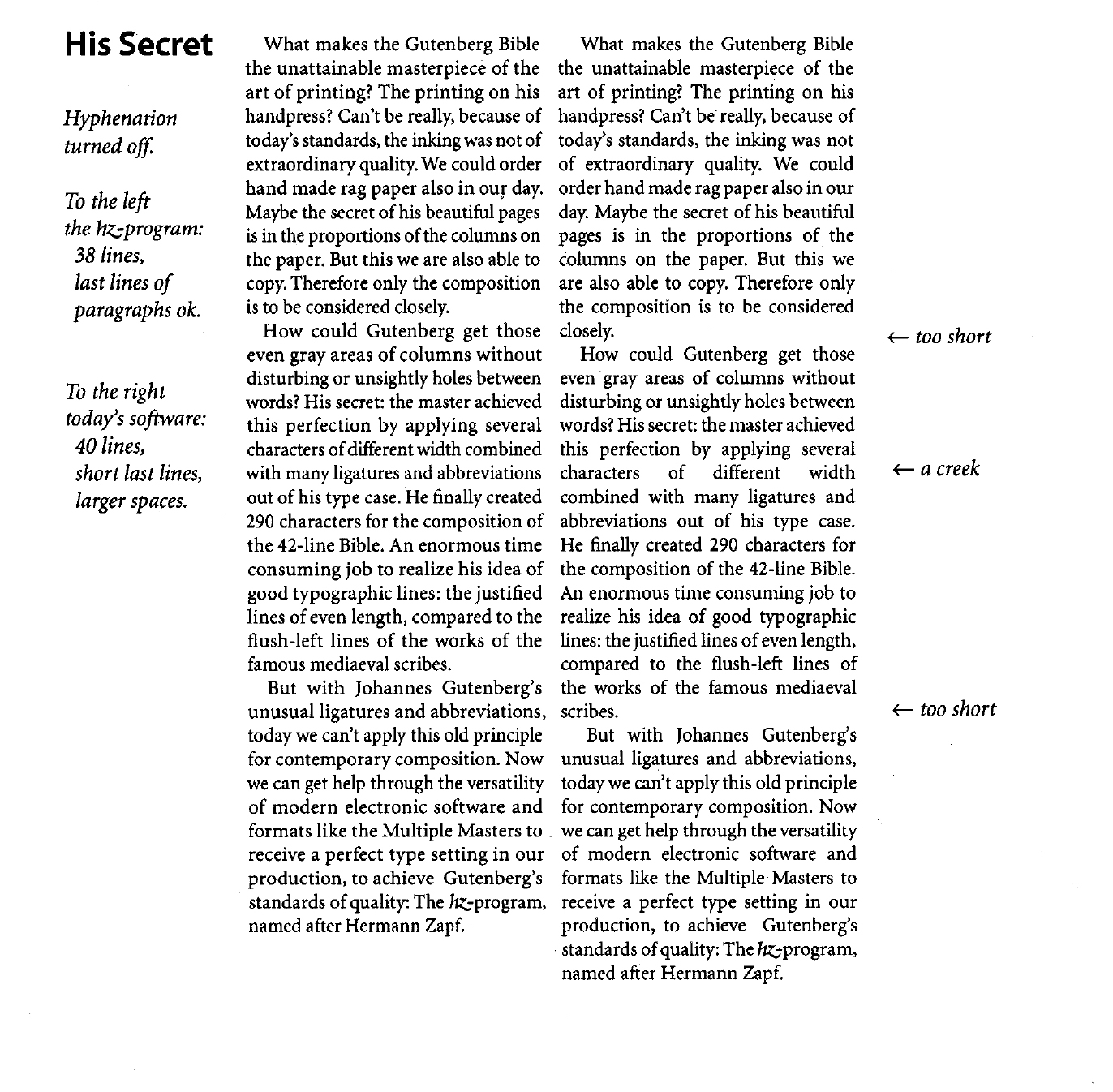
Automated justification in a demonstration from the early 1990s. The technology was later purchased by Adobe and added to their InDesign product.

=== Typographic anomalies ===
Justification sometimes leads to typographic anomalies. One example: when justification is used in narrow columns, extremely large spaces may appear between words on lines with only two or three words.

Another example: when the spaces between words line up approximately above one another in several loose lines, a distracting river of white space may appear. Rivers appear in right-aligned, left-aligned and centered settings too, but are more likely to appear in justified text, because of the additional word spacing. Since there is no added white space built into a typical full stop (period), other than that above the full stop itself, full stops contribute to the river effect in a limited way.

At one time, common word-processing software adjusted only the spacing between words, which was a source of the river problem. Modern word processing packages and professional publishing software significantly reduce the river effect by adjusting also the spacing between characters. Additionally, these systems use advanced digital typography techniques such as automatically choosing among different glyphs for the same character and slightly stretching or shrinking the character in order to better fill the line. The technique of glyph scaling or microtypography has been implemented by Adobe InDesign and more recent versions of pdfTeX.

The problem of loose lines is reduced by using hyphenation. With older typesetting systems and WYSIWYG word processors, this was done manually: the compositor or author added hyphenation on a case-by-case basis. Currently, most typesetting systems (also called layout programs) and modern word processors hyphenate automatically, using a hyphenation algorithm. In addition, professional typesetting programs almost always provide for the use of an exception dictionary, in part because no algorithm hyphenates all words correctly, and in part because different publishers will follow different dictionaries. Different publishers may also have different rules about permissible hyphenation. Most publishers follow a basic system such as the Chicago Manual of Style or Oxford style, but will overlay their own "house style", which further restricts permissible hyphenation.

=== Scripts and non-alphabetic writing systems ===
Word-processing software usually uses a different kind of justification when dealing with cursive scripts, such as those used in Arabic, Syriac or Mongolian texts. Using kashida, Arabic words are elongated rather than expanding the spaces between words. Another technique sometimes used is word heaping.

The Chinese, Japanese and Korean writing systems have historically used Han ideographs, which are justified by default, since characters were fitted into a uniform square grid. Multi-character words were also broken over lines freely, as CJK languages traditionally have minimal regard for word segmentation in their orthographies. With the continuous adoption of European-inspired punctuation, numeral justification has become a more flexible question in these scripts. Chinese and Japanese texts do not use word spaces, therefore justification focuses on adjusting spaces around punctuation, boundaries and inter-character spacing. Korean adopted the use of word spaces.

=== Accessibility ===
People with cognitive disabilities have problems with reading justified text. The uneven spacing between words in fully justified text, as mentioned above, can cause "rivers of white" space to run down the page making reading difficult and in some cases impossible. Not justifying text on a web page, or providing a mechanism for user to remove text justification, is required to meet the Web Content Accessibility Guidelines AAA success criterion 1.4.8 ("Visual Presentation").

== History ==
Justification has been the preferred setting of type in many Western languages through the history of movable type. This is due to the classic Western manuscript book page being built of a column or two columns, which is considered to look "best" if it is even-margined on the left and right. The classical Western column did not rigorously justify, but came as close as feasible when the skill of the penman and the character of the manuscript permitted. Historically, both scribal and typesetting traditions took advantage of abbreviations (sigla), ligatures, and swashes to help maintain the rhythm and colour of a justified line.

Its use has waned somewhat only since the early 20th century through the advocacy of the typographer Jan Tschichold's book Asymmetric Typography and the freer typographic treatment of the Bauhaus, Dada, and Russian constructivist movements.

Not all "flush left" settings in traditional typography were identical. In flush left text, words are separated on a line by the default word space built into the font.

Continuous casting typesetting systems such as the Linotype were able to reduce the jaggedness of the right-hand sides of adjacent lines of flush left composition by inserting self-adjusting space bands between words to evenly distribute white space, taking excessive space that would have occurred at the end of the line and redistributing it between words. This feature is also available in desktop publishing systems, although most now default to more sophisticated approaches.

Graphic designers and typesetters using desktop systems also have the option to adjust word and letter spacing, or "tracking", on a manual line-by-line basis to achieve more even overall spacing. Some modern desktop publishing programs, such as Adobe InDesign, evaluate the effects of all the different possible line-break choices on the entire paragraph, to choose the one that creates the least variance from the ideal spacing while justifying the lines (so as to reduce rivers); this also gives the least uneven edge when set with a ragged margin.

== See also ==
- Word wrap
- Runaround (typography)
