= Letter spacing =

Physical spacing of characters in text

Docent sights juggernaut
Headline set tight with minus letter spacing
Docent sights juggernaut
Headline set with no additional letter spacing
Docent sights juggernaut
Headline with more open letter spacing
Docent sights juggernaut
Headline with open letter spacing similar to metal type
Docent sights juggernaut
Headline with still more letter spacing
Docent sights juggernaut
Headline with wide letter spacing
Docent sights juggernaut
Headline with wider letter spacing, sometimes used for broadcast

Examples of headline letter spacing

Letter spacing, character spacing or tracking is an optically consistent typographical adjustment to the space between letters to change the visual density of a line or block of text. Letter spacing is distinct from kerning, which adjusts the spacing of particular pairs of adjacent characters such as "7." which would appear to be badly spaced if left unadjusted, and leading, the spacing between lines.

== History ==
Historically, with metal type, a kern meant having a letter stick out beyond the metal slug to which it was attached, or having part of the body of the slug cut off to allow letters to overlap. A kern could therefore only bring letters closer together (negative spacing). Digital kerning could go in either direction. Tracking can similarly go in either direction, but with metal type, one could make groups of letters only further apart (positive spacing).

In the days of hot metal typesetting, letter spacing required adding horizontal space between letters of words set in metal type in increments of a minimum of a half-point. Some publishers and typesetters avoided letter spacing because it was costly in materials and labor. Letter spacing required hand insertion of copper (a half-point), brass (one point), and printer's "lead" (two points) spaces between individual pieces of type or between matrices. Despite the cost, letter spacing was used in print advertising, book publishing, and custom printing (such as high-end stationery, business cards, wedding invitations, and such). It was also used for very short phrases set in all caps or small caps to prevent the phrases from appearing too dark compared to the rest of the page.

Increased letter-spacing has sometimes been used for emphasis, most often in blackletter typesetting and in typewriter manuscripts, where alternative forms of emphasis like italic or bold fonts are less available. In German-language contexts, where blackletter typefaces survived longer than elsewhere, the practice (called sperren) is not quite extinct. Printer and type designer Frederic Goudy stated that "Men who would letterspace blackletter would steal sheep." Goudy's statement inspired the title of the book Stop Stealing Sheep, an introduction to typography.

== Digital systems ==
Word processing and desktop publishing programs for personal computers, such as LibreOffice Writer, Microsoft Word, Microsoft Publisher, WordPerfect, QuarkXPress, Adobe InDesign, Adobe FrameMaker, Adobe Illustrator, and Adobe Photoshop, use differing methods of adjusting letter spacing. Most systems have the default letter spacing at zero and instead use the character widths and kerning information built into the font itself.

Although digital type sets tighter than metal type on average, this results primarily from the availability of kerning. Digital type does allow for negative sidebearings, which were uncommon in metal type because of the difficulty in cutting a "kern".

In the days of machine-implemented lead typesetting, such as Linotype machines and the Monotype System, letter spacing had to be uniform. In modern digital page-layout software, high-end applications all use relative measurements proportional to the size of the type. QuarkXPress uses units of 1/200 of an em, and Adobe InDesign uses 1/1000 of an em. Therefore, in QuarkXPress, a tracking setting of 3 reduces the visual density of the text noticeably, but in InDesign a tracking setting of 3 is barely noticeable.

== Fixed spaces ==
Letter spacing may also refer to the insertion of fixed spaces, as was commonly done in hand-set metal type to achieve letter spacing. Fixed spaces vary by size and include hair spaces, thin spaces, word spaces, en-spaces, and em-spaces. An en-space is equal to half the current point size, and an em-space is the same width as the current point size.

=== Changing kerning perception ===
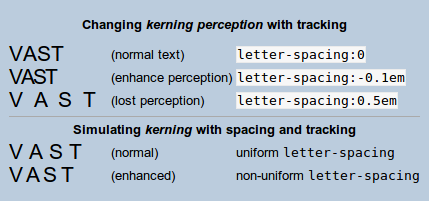
Kerning contrasted with tracking (letter spacing): with spacing the "kerning perception" is lost. While tracking adjusts the space between characters evenly, regardless of the characters, kerning adjusts the space based on character pairs. There is strong kerning between the "V" and the "A" and no kerning between the "S" and the "T".

Even with no kerning control, a visually pleasing result can be achieved with some control of the space between letters.

With CSS1, a standard of 1996, the letter-spacing property (illustrated) offers some control for "kerning perception", as kerning can be simulated with non-uniform spacing between letters. The CSS3 standard includes the font-kerning property. In the meantime, web designers used the workaround of letter-spacing, mainly to enhance spaced texts of titles and banners.

== Legibility ==
Adjusting the letter spacing of a given text has been shown to affect reading speed and accuracy. A wide body of research suggests that text with wider letter spacing, as well as wider line and word spacing, leads to increased reading comprehension among both dyslexic and non-dyslexic children. Contrarily, tighter spacing is thought to decrease comprehension among such population subgroups, and is accompanied by crowding and a perception of smallness.

Letter spacing adjustments are frequently employed in news design. Due to deadlines, news editors do not usually have time to rewrite paragraphs that end in split words or create widows or orphans.

Discussing Comic Sans, some researchers, including Sue Walker, Jenny Thomson, and John Stein, posit that the typeface's wide spacing, rather than the shape of its characters, is the reason for its success among dyslexics.

== See also ==
- Kashida, in Arabic scripts, extending the line joining characters
- Microtypography
- Sentence spacing
- Typographic ligature
- Word spacing
- Text shaping – Process of converting text to glyph indices and positions
