= REVTeX =

LaTeX macro collection

REVTeX, sometimes stylized as REVTeX, is a collection of LaTeX macros which is maintained and distributed by the American Physical Society with auxiliary files and a user support guide, as part of a "REVTeX toolbox." REVTeX is used to submit papers to journals published by the American Physical Society (APS), the American Institute of Physics (AIP), and the Optical Society of America (OSA). REVTeX is accepted by a few other technical publishers as well.

REVTeX was created by APS to support its authors in the editorial process and to facilitate the production of APS journals. Subsequent to REVTeX's original release and APS’ success with this electronic publishing program, a collaborative effort of the APS, AIP, OSA, and the American Astronomical Society (AAS) was initiated to coordinate a revision to REVTeX and to AASTeX (used by AAS authors). The result was a version of REVTeX that APS, AIP, and OSA authors could use, with minimal impact to authors who submitted to multiple scholarly journals.

REVTeX is licensed under the LaTeX Project Public License.

== History ==
The REVTeX project was begun in 1986, when the American Physical Society was exploring how to support standardized electronic submission of scientific papers. They launched the initial version of REVTeX in 1988, naming it after an abbreviation of the Physical Review journals and the TeX typesetting system. According to APS, by the early 1990s, REVTeX submissions accounted for around 25% of submissions to APS journals.

Version history:

- 1988 – Initial release.
- March 1990 – Version 2 released.
- November 1992 – Version 3.0 released.
- August 1996 – Version 3.1 released.
- July 2001 – Version 4.0 released.
- March 2010 – Version 4.1 released.
- January 2019 – Version 4.2 released.

== See also ==
- TeX
- List of TeX extensions
