= Bogusław Jackowski =

Polish computer scientist (born 1950)

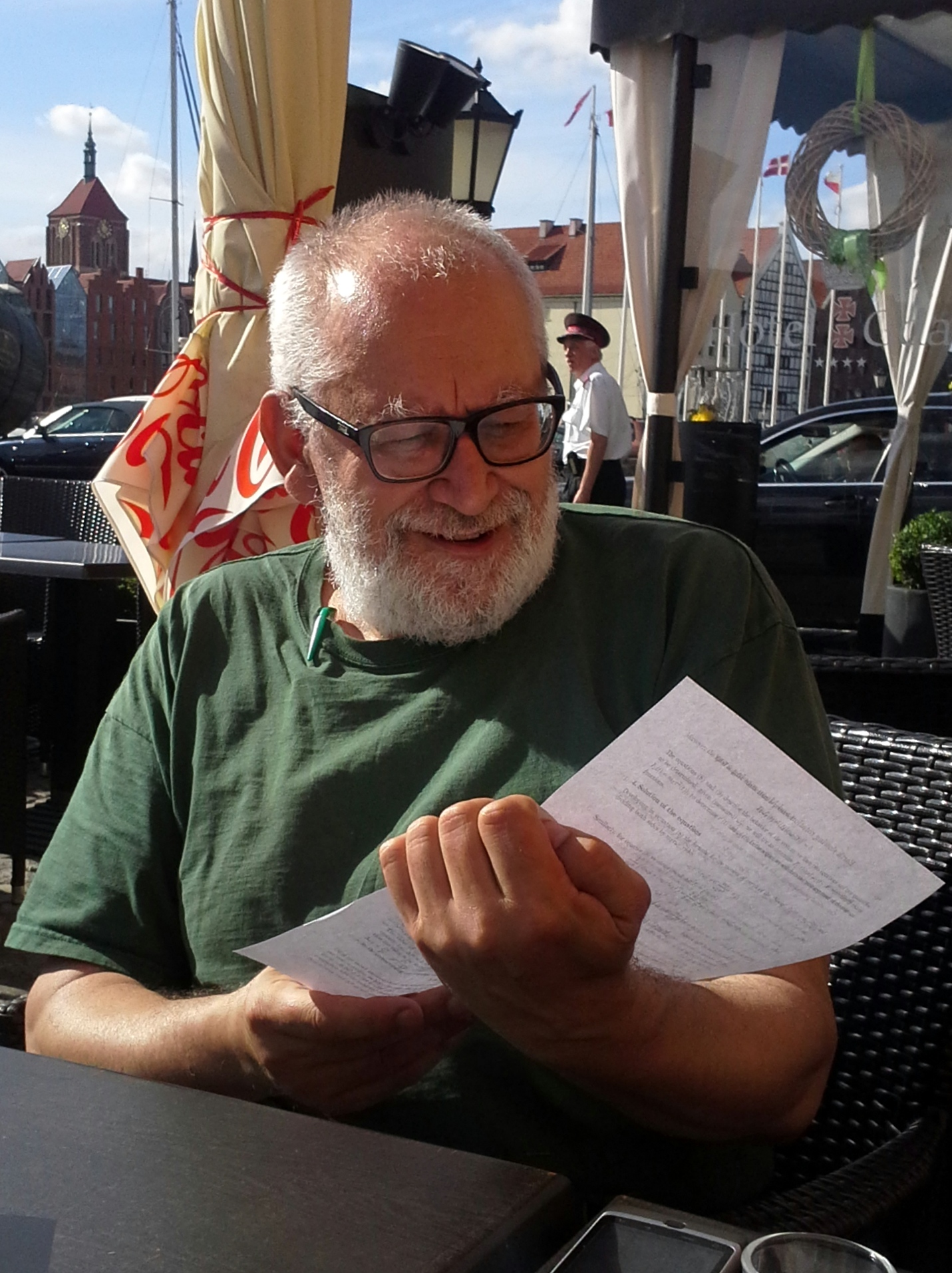
- Bogusław Jackowski in Gdańsk in 2015
- Pronunciation: [bɔɡ'uswaf jaˈt͡skɔfskʲi]
- Born: 13 April 1950 (age 76); Gdańsk, Poland
- Other names: Jacko pronounced [ˈjat͡skɔ]
- Citizenship: Poland
- Education: Gdańsk University of Technology
- Scientific career
- Fields: Computer science

Bogusław L. Jackowski (Note: Polish pronunciation: [ˈbɔɡuswaf jaˈt͡skɔfskʲi]) (born 13 April 1950), also known as "Jacko", (Note: Polish pronunciation: [ˈjat͡skɔ]) is a Polish computer scientist, typographer, publisher, and amateur musician. He is best known for his work on the TeX typesetting system, the Latin Modern font family, and the TeX Gyre project.

== Biography ==
Jackowski was born in Gdańsk, Poland in 1950. He graduated from Częstochowa's (Note: Polish pronunciation: [ʧɛɲstɔˈxɔvʲɛ]) No. 4 High School (Lyceum) named in honor of Henryk Sienkiewicz (Note: Polish: IV Liceum Ogólnokształcące im. Henryka Sienkiewicza; pronounced [ˈʧvartɨ ˈlit͡sɛum ɔɡuwɲɔksʲtaʋt͡sɔnɕɛ ɪm ɛnrɨka ɕɛnkʲɛvʲit͡ʂfɛ]) in 1967 and from the Chemical Engineering Department of Gdańsk University of Technology in 1972.

He began his career as a programmer at the computer center of Gdańsk University, then became an assistant in the Mathematics Department. In the early 1980s he moved to the Institute of Water Building at the Polish Academy of Sciences.

In 1992, along with Marek Ryćko, he founded the publishing house Do, which in 1995 published the book Kabaret Starszych Panów, Tom I, containing records of the first four evenings of the cabaret. At the beginning of 1998 he resigned from the co-ownership of the publishing house and devoted himself to work in BOP s.c., since 1993 a Gdańsk-based company providing graphic and publishing services – conducted with Piotr Pianowski. BOP, among other things, graphically prepared and printed the series of albums Był sobie Gdańsk (Note: Polish pronunciation: [bɨw ˈsɔbʲɛ ɡdaɲsk]; lit. 'Once upon a time in Gdańsk') and six issues of the quarterly magazine of the same title.

He is a founding member of the Polish TeX Users Group (GUST), and since 1995 an Honorary Member of the Association. Within the activities undertaken by GUST, he actively participates in the development of the computer typesetting of free software public domain and Polish fonts. Together with Janusz M. Nowacki he is the author of the Latin Modern family of Computer Modern-based fonts. Also with Nowacki and Piotr Strzelczyk he is the author of the electronic version of the Antykwa Półtawskiego font, called by some as the "Polish national font". He also runs the TeX Gyre project, which resulted in Unicode OpenType fonts and mathematical extensions for some of them.

Jackowski has authored many articles in specialist magazines and some regular columns in popular periodicals, some of which have been anthologized in the computer science collection Notes on the Balloon.

He is the holder of seven of Donald Knuth's certificates.

== Bibliography ==
- Kubiak, Ryszard; Jackowski, Bogusław; Sokołowski, Stefan (February 1979). "Complexity of sorting by distributive partitioning". Information Processing Letters. 9 (2): 100–. doi:10.1016/0020-0190(79)90139-X. ISSN 0020-0190.
- Kołodko, Jerzy; Jackowski, Bogusław (1983). Kinematyczny model spiętrzeń sztormowych. Opracowanie teoretycznych podstaw kinematycznego modelu spiętrzeń sztormowych [Kinematic Model of Stormwater Pools. Development of Theoretical Foundations of Kinematic Model of Stormwater Pools]. Gdańsk: Wydawnictwo IBW PAN. pp. 8 s., 6 fig.
- Kubale, Marek; Jackowski, Bogusław (April 1985). "A generalized implicit enumeration algorithm for graph coloring". Communications of the ACM. 28 (4): 412–418. doi:10.1145/3341.3350. ISSN 0001-0782. S2CID 16498974.
- Jackowski, Bogusław (1986). Zakres stosowalności przybliżenia parabolicznego dla liniowych modeli spiętrzeń sztormowych [The Scope of Applicability of the Parabolic Approximation for Linear Stormwater Pool Models]. Gdańsk: Wydawnictwo IBW PAN. pp. 27 s., 8 fig., bib.
- Jackowski, Bogusław (1987). Paraboliczny model spiętrzeń sztormowych: wpływ nieliniowości na charakterystykę procesu [Parabolic Model of Stormwater Pools: Impact of Nonlinearity on the Process Characteristics]. Gdańsk: Wydawnictwo IBW PAN. pp. 25 s., app. 19.
- Jackowski, Bogusław; Nowacki, Janusz Marian (2003). "Latin Modern: Enhancing Computer Modern with accents, accents, accents" (PDF). TUGboat. 24:1.
- Pielona, Zyta; Kobyliński, Szymon (1992). 750 razy gra półsłówek [Seven hundred and fifty games of half-words]. Warszawa: Wydawnicywo Do. ISBN 8385586008. OCLC 34930523.
- Sokołowski S., Jackowski B., Janota E., Fuglewicz P. Towards Statistically-based Semantics of Linguistic Resources. „Workshop on International Proofing Tools and Language Technologies, July 1–2, 2004, Patras, Greece”, 2004.
- Jackowski, Bogusław (2006). "Appendix G illuminated" (PDF). TUGboat. 27:1.
- Jackowski, Bogusław; Strzelczyk, Piotr (2011). How to make more than one math OpenType font, or the Beasts of Fonts [Jak stworzyć więcej niż jeden czcionkę OpenType dla matematyki, czyli Bestie Czcionek] (PDF). Bachotek: Grupa Użytkowników Systemu TeX.
- Jackowski, Bogusław (2012). "Computing the area and winding number for a Bézier curve" (PDF). TUGboat. 33:1.
- Jackowski, Bogusław; Wawrykiewicz, Stanisław. "Fontowe ABC: Fonty rodziny Computer Modern" [ABCs of Fonts: Fonts of the Computer Modern Family]. Grupa Użytkowników Systemu TeX (in Polish).
- Jackowski, Bogusław (2013). "Typografowie, programiści i matematycy, czyli przypadek estetycznie zadowalającej interpolacji" [Typographers, Programmers and Mathematicians, or the Case of Aesthetically Satisfying Interpolation] (PDF). Acta Poligraphica. 1: 11–30.
- Jackowski, Bogusław; Strzelczyk, Piotr; Pianowski, Piotr (2014). Postęp projektu TeX Gyre Math Font: TeX Gyre Schola Math lub Coup de Grâce [Progress of the TeX Gyre Math Font Project: TeX Gyre Schola Math or Coup de Grâce] (PDF) (in Polish). Bachotek: Grupa Użytkowników Systemu TeX.
- Jackowski, Bogusław; Fuglewicz, Piotr W. (11 August 2016). "W chorej mowie chory duch" [In a Sick Language a Sick Mind]. Studio Opinii (in Polish).
