= Word spacing =

Typographic practice of putting space between words

Word spacing in typography is space between words, as contrasted with letter-spacing (space between letters of words) and sentence spacing (space between sentences). Typographers may modify the spacing of letters or words in a body of type to aid readability and copy fit, or for aesthetic effect. In web browsers and standardized digital typography, word spacing is controlled by the CSS1 word-spacing property.

== History ==
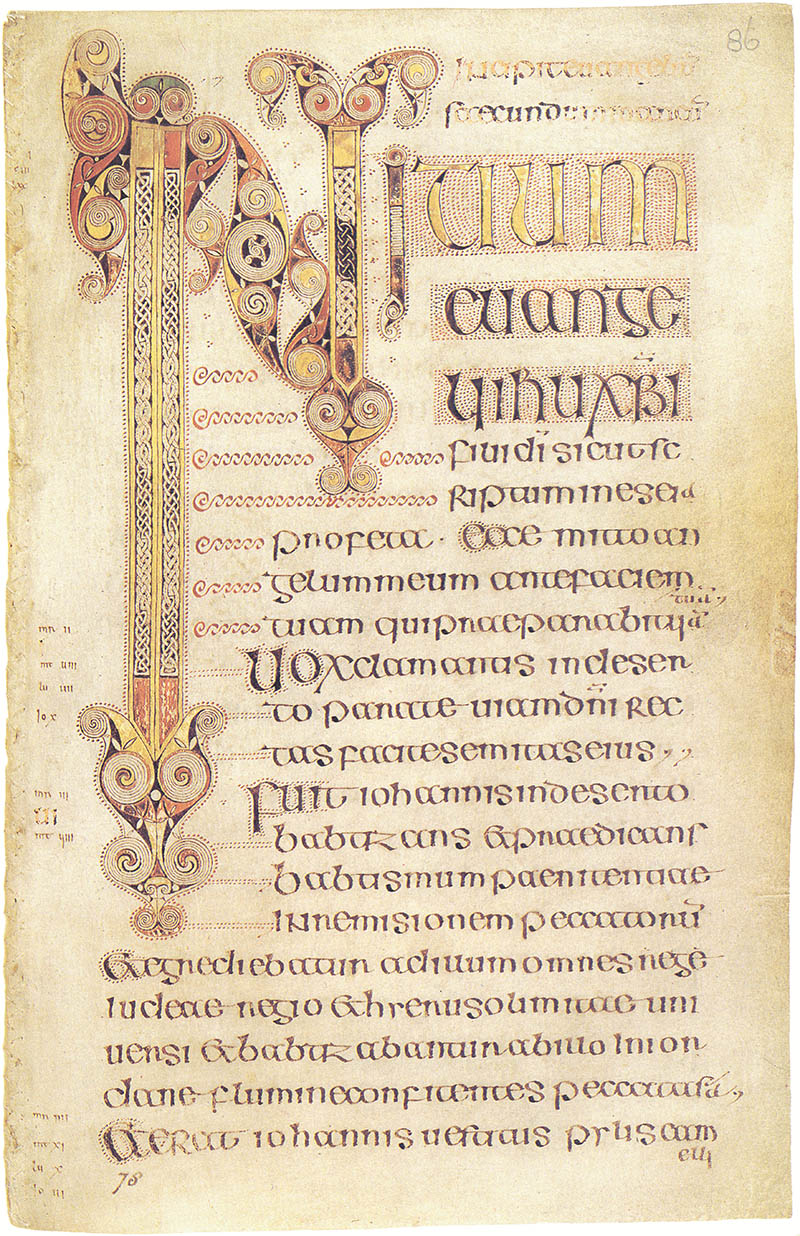
Gospel of Mark in the Book of Durrow (Ireland, 7th century AD), with distinct spaces between words.

Most classical Latin texts were written in scriptio continua, a continuous string of characters without spaces to mark word boundaries. However, some early Greek and Roman texts used interpuncts, small dots, to separate words. Word spacing began much later. Irish monks first started to add word spacing to texts in the late 7th century, creating what Paul Sänger, in his book The Spaces between the Words, refers to as aerated text. By the 11th century, scribes in northern Europe were separating Latin text canonically, that is, with spaces between words, just as is done today in standard written text.

== Effect on readability ==
While spoken language has no audible gaps, the visual spaces introduced between words can make reading more efficient. When text and spacing are consistent, this makes it easier to read.

Geoffrey Dowding describes the nature of spacing since the invention of printing from moveable type in the fifteenth century. Smooth and efficient reading required text to be closely spaced and “not en or em quadded!” The convention of having close spacing has lasted for two reasons: because it is easier to read than text which has wider spaces and because it looks better. For the first reason, adult readers take in words as units, and it would be unsuitable for “compositors, in settings not intended for young children, to break the eye’s track by introducing great gaps of white between words”. Words must flow smoothly into lines. For the second reason, the colour or “blackness” of the line looks better when it has close word-spacing, otherwise a widely-spaced line of text will appear grey.

Language can also be a factor that typographers would take into consideration for word spacing. For a language like Latin, “most boundaries are marked by grammatical tags, and a smaller space is therefore sufficient”. In English, the ability to read a line easily, instead of needing to make sense of it first, is also attributed by good word spacing.

Word spacing has the ability to express the meaning and idea behind a word, which typographers consider when working on design works and text. With a written piece of text, the designer has to remember to make sure they do not add too much or too little space between words; otherwise it could ruin the texture and tone.

=== Views ===
Geoffrey Dowding claims that Jan Tschichold’s rule is that “spacing should be about a middle space or the thickness of an ‘i’ in the type size used. Wide spaces should be strictly avoided.” He also claims that for Tschichold, it was better for words to be broken up in order avoid wide spacing. His other views on this issue of wide spacing include that it could depend on the typeface to determine word spacing, so long as it does not look overspaced. The perfect word space is affected by the circumstance; “at larger sizes, when letterfit is tightened, the spacing of words can be tightened as well.” Aaron Burns, a typographer, suggested that the lowercase “r” was the best size for spaces between words. Edward Johnston, a noted calligrapher, supported that the lowercase “o” was the more appropriate size of measurement for spacing.

== See also ==
- Letter spacing
- Kerning
- Leading

== External references ==
- Finer Points in the Spacing & Arrangement of Type, Geoffrey Dowding
