= ConTeXt =

General-purpose document processor, derived from TeX

- Original authors: Mainly Hans Hagen and Pragma ADE
- Developers: Mainly Hans Hagen, Taco Hoekwater, Aditya Mahajan, Mojca Miklavec, Wolfgang Schuster
- Stable release: Mark IV 0.61 / May 24, 2015
- Operating system: Multiplatform (TeX)
- Type: Document processor, document markup language
- License: Program code under GPLv2 and Documentation under CC BY-NC-SA 3.0
- Website: contextgarden

ConTeXt, stylised as ConTeXt, is a general-purpose document processor. Like LaTeX, it is derived from the TeX typesetting system. ConTeXt is especially suited for structured documents, automated document production, very fine typography, and multilingual typesetting. It is based in part on TeX, and uses a document markup language for manuscript preparation. The typographical and automated capabilities of ConTeXt are extensive, including interfaces for handling microtypography, multiple footnotes and footnote classes, and manipulating OpenType fonts and features. Moreover, ConTeXt offers extensive support for colors, backgrounds, hyperlinks, presentations, figure-text integration, and conditional compilation. It gives the user extensive control over formatting, while making it easy to create new layouts and styles without learning the low-level TeX macro language.

While comparisons can be made between ConTeXt and LaTeX, the primary objectives of the two systems are distinct. From the outset, ConTeXt has been a typography and typesetting system designed to give users straightforward and consistent access to advanced typographical control, which is crucial for general-purpose typesetting. LaTeX's original vision, on the other hand, was to insulate the user from typographical decisions—an approach particularly useful for tasks such as submitting articles to a scientific journal. Although LaTeX has evolved from this original vision, ConTeXt's unified design prevents the package clashes which are often experienced with LaTeX.

ConTeXt provides a multilingual user interface with support for markup in English, Dutch, German, French, and Italian, and support for output in many scripts including western European, eastern European, Arabic, Chinese, Japanese, and Korean. It also allows the user to use different TeX engines, like LuaTeX (MkIV) and LuaMetaTeX (LMTX). Older versions (MkII) worked with pdfTeX or XeTeX.

As its native drawing engine, ConTeXt integrates a superset of MetaPost called MetaFun, which allows users to draw page backgrounds and ornaments with MetaPost. MetaFun can also be used directly with MetaPost. ConTeXt also supports the use of other external drawing engines, like PGF/TikZ and PSTricks.

ConTeXt also provides a macro package for typesetting chemical structure diagrams with TeX, called PPCHTeX, as well as many other modules. This package can also be used with plain TeX and LaTeX.

Originally titled pragmatex, ConTeXt was given its name around 1996 by Hans Hagen from PRAGMA Advanced Document Engineering (Pragma ADE), a Netherlands-based company.

== License ==
ConTeXt is free software; the program code (i.e. anything not under the /doc subtree) is distributed under the GNU GPL, and the documentation is provided under Creative Commons Attribution NonCommercial ShareAlike license.

The ConTeXt official manual(2001) and ConTeXt official mini tutorial (1999) are documents copyrighted by Pragma, but there is a repository for the future manual released under the GNU Free Documentation License. As of April 2009, there is an up-to-date version of the fonts and typography chapters.

== Versions ==
The current version of ConTeXt is LMTX, introduced in April 2019 as the successor to Mark IV (MkIV). Previous versions—Mark II (MkII) and Mark I—are no longer maintained.

According to the developers, the principal difference between LMTX and its predecessors is that the newest version "uses a compilation and scripting engine that is specifically developed with ConTeXt in mind: LuaMetaTeX ... [which] has been optimised heavily for ConTeXt use." Previously, MkIV used LuaTeX and MkII used pdfTeX.

== History ==
ConTeXt was created by Hans Hagen and Ton Otten of Pragma ADE in the Netherlands, around 1991, due to the need for educational typesetting material.

Around 1996, Hans Hagen coined the name ConTeXt, meaning "text with tex" (con-tex-t; "con" is a Latin preposition meaning "together with"). Before 1996, ConTeXt was used only within Pragma ADE, but in 1996 it began to be adopted by a wider audience.

In July 2004, the contextgarden.net wiki page was created.

ConTeXt low-level code was originally written in Dutch. Around 2005, the ConTeXt developers began translating this to English, resulting in the version known as MKII, which is now stable and frozen.

In August 2007, Hans Hagen presented the MKIV version; the first public beta was released later that year.

During the ConTeXt User Meeting 2008, Mojca Miklavec presented ConTeXt Minimals, a distribution of ConTeXt containing the latest binaries and intended to have a small memory footprint, thus demanding less bandwidth for updates. In August 2008, this distribution was registered as a project on the Canonical Launchpad website.

In June 2008, Patrick Gundlach wrote the first post in ConTeXt blog.

In July 2009, ConTeXt started a git repository.

In November 2010, the ConTeXt Group was created.

In April 2019, LMTX (ConTeXt LuaMetaTeX) was announced.

== Example of code ==
Making ConTeXt documents is simple: make a plain text file, and compile it with the context script. The result of this process is a PDF file (ConTeXt also can generate a DVI file). An example is shown below.

ConTeXt documents come with the file extension .tex, or an extension demarking the version required: .mkii, .mkiv, or .mkxl for regular TeX, .mkvi or .mklx for a dialect that supports named macro parameters in addition to TeX’s numeric ones.

% This line is a comment because % precedes it.
% It specifies the format of head named 'title'
% Specifically the style of the font: sans serif
% + bold + big font.

\setuphead[title][style={\ss\bfd},
    before={\begingroup},
    after={John Doe, the author\smallskip%
           \currentdate\bigskip\endgroup}]

\starttext

\title{\CONTEXT}

\section{Text}
\CONTEXT\ is a document preparation system for the 
\TEX\ typesetting program. It offers programmable 
desktop publishing features and extensive 
facilities for automating most aspects of 
typesetting and desktop publishing, including 
numbering and cross-referencing (for example to 
equation \in[eqn:famous-emc]), tables and figures, 
page layout, bibliographies, and much more.

It was originally written around 1990 by Hans 
Hagen. It could be an alternative or complement 
to \LATEX.

\section{Maths}
With \CONTEXT\ we could write maths. Equations 
can be automatically numbered.

\placeformula[eqn:famous-emc]
\startformula
    E = mc^2
\stopformula
with
\placeformula[eqn:def-m]
\startformula
    m = \frac{m_0}{\sqrt{1-\frac{v^2}{c^2}}}
\stopformula

\stoptext

ConTeXt document

== See also ==
- Comparison of TeX editors
- List of TeX extensions
- LaTeX
- TeX
