= JsMath =

Defunct JavaScript library

jsMath
- Developers: Davide P. Cervone and others
- Final release: 3.6e
- Written in: JavaScript
- Operating system: Cross-platform
- Type: Software library
- License: Apache License
- Website: www.math.union.edu/~dpvc/jsMath/

jsMath was a JavaScript library for displaying mathematics in browsers in a cross-platform way. It was free software released under the Apache License.

Produced by Union College Professor, Davide P. Cervone in 2004, jsMath was built as a cross-platform solution to add mathematical equations in standard TeX notation to HTML pages. As an alternative to MathML, jsMath was built to support different browsers on Microsoft Windows, Macintosh OS X, and Linux.

While not officially discontinued, jsMath has not been updated since Version 3.6e on March 21st, 2010.

jsMath was succeeded by MathJax, another program that Cervone would contribute to.

== See also ==
- MathJax
- TeX and LaTeX, from which jsMath inherits its syntax and layout algorithms
- MathML, a W3C standard enabling direct math rendering in the browser, using an XML syntax
- ASCIIMathML, a client-side library for writing MathML in a subset of LaTeX math syntax
- Google Chart API
