= MKM =

MKM may refer to:

- MKM Building Supplies, a builder's merchant based in Kingston upon Hull, Grimsby and other locations around England and the UK
  - MKM Stadium, a stadium located in Hull, named after the local builder's merchant
- Mariborska kolesarska mreža, cycling network, NGO promoting cycling in Maribor, Slovenia
- Mathematical knowledge management
- MKM Educational Trust
- MKM steel
- Mukah Airport IATA code
- Museum Küppersmühle
- Melksham railway station station code
- Sukhoi Su-30MKM
