= MathJax =

System to format mathematics on the web

- Developer: American Mathematical Society
- Stable release: 4.1.3 / 3 July 2026; 4 months ago
- Written in: JavaScript
- Operating system: Cross-platform
- Type: Mathematical software
- License: Apache License 2.0
- Website: www.mathjax.org
- Repository: github.com/mathjax/MathJax

MathJax is a cross-browser JavaScript library that displays mathematical notation in web browsers, using MathML, LaTeX, and ASCIIMathML markup. MathJax is released as open-source software under the Apache License.

The MathJax project started in 2009 as the successor to an earlier JavaScript mathematics formatting library, jsMath, and is managed by the American Mathematical Society. The project was founded by the American Mathematical Society, Design Science, and the Society for Industrial and Applied Mathematics and is supported by numerous sponsors such as the American Institute of Physics and Stack Exchange.

MathJax is used by web sites including arXiv, Elsevier's ScienceDirect, MathSciNet, n-category cafe, MathOverflow, Wikipedia (formerly, on the backend), Scholarpedia, Project Euclid journals, IEEEXplore, Publons, Coursera, and the All-Russian Mathematical Portal.

== Features ==
MathJax is downloaded as part of a web page, scans the page for mathematical markup, and typesets the mathematical information accordingly. Thus, MathJax requires no installation of software or extra fonts on the reader's system. This allows MathJax to run in any browser with JavaScript support, including mobile devices.

MathJax can display math by using a combination of HTML and CSS or by using the browser's native MathML support, when available. The exact method MathJax uses to typeset math is determined by the capabilities of the user's browser, fonts available on the user's system, and configuration settings. MathJax v2.0-beta introduced SVG rendering.

In the case of HTML and CSS typesetting, MathJax maximizes math display quality by using math fonts if available and by resorting to images for older browsers. For newer browsers that support web fonts, MathJax provides a comprehensive set of web fonts, which MathJax downloads as needed. If the browser does not support web fonts, MathJax checks whether valid fonts are available on the user's system. If this does not work, MathJax provides images of any symbols needed. MathJax can be configured to enable or disable web fonts, local fonts, and image fonts.

MathJax uses the STIX fonts for including mathematics in web pages. Installing the fonts on the local computer improves MathJax’s typesetting speed.

MathJax can display mathematical notation written in LaTeX or MathML markup. Because MathJax is meant only for math display, whereas LaTeX is a document layout language, MathJax only supports the subset of LaTeX used to describe mathematical notation.

MathJax also supports math accessibility by exposing MathML through its API to assistive technology software, as well as the basic WAI-ARIA "role" and older alt attributes.

The MathJax architecture is designed to support the addition of input languages and display methods in the future via dynamically loaded modules. MathJax also includes a JavaScript API for enumerating and interacting with math instances in a page.

== Browser compatibility ==
MathJax renders math in most popular browsers, including Internet Explorer 6+, Firefox 3+, Google Chrome 0.3+, Safari 2.0+, Opera 9.5+, iPhone/iPad Safari, and the Android browser. Some older versions of browsers do not support web fonts (with the @font-face CSS construct), so they have to use MathJax image font mode. The browser compatibility list is available at the official site.

== Plugin support ==
MathJax can be easily added to many popular web platforms.

== Node.js ==
MathJax can be used in Node.js since version 3; for version 2, the MathJax-node library provides Node.js compatibility.

== Equation-editor compatibility ==
Any MathJax equation displayed in a supported browser can be copied out in MathML or LaTeX format via "Show Math as" sub-menu if right-button clicked or control-clicked on it. Then it can be pasted in any equation editor that supports MathML or LaTeX, such as Mathematica, MathType, MathMagic, or Firemath, for re-use.

Equations generated in MathML or LaTeX format by any 3rd party equation editor can be used in MathJax enabled web pages.

== TeX support ==
MathJax replicates the math environment commands of LaTeX. AMS-LaTeX math commands are supported via extensions. MathJax also supports TeX macros and miscellaneous formatting like \color and \underline.

== MathML support ==
MathJax added partial support for MathML 2.0 and some MathML 3.0 constructs in its beta 2 release. MathJax supports presentation MathML and, as of version 2.2, provides experimental support for content MathML.

== CDN servers ==
The MathJax site has been providing a content delivery network (CDN) where the JavaScript needed for MathJax to work can be loaded by the browser at run time from the CDN. This simplifies the installation and ensures the latest version of the library is always used. Over time usage of the server has grown from 1.3TB per month traffic in 2011 to 70TB per month in 2017. Due to increasing cost of hosting the server, the main CDN server shut down at the end of April 2017. Alternative third party CDN servers are available.

== See also ==
- Category:Symbol typefaces
- Google Chart API
- KaTeX – JavaScript alternative to MathJax
