= MathMagic =

Software for editing mathematical equations

- MathMagic Personal with sample equations and a few palettes, running on macOS X
- Developer: InfoLogic
- Release: 1 September 1998; 27 years ago
- Stable release: v10.44 for macOS, v9.31 for Windows / 10 June 2026
- Operating system: macOS, Microsoft Windows, Android, iOS
- Type: Formula editors
- License: Proprietary
- Website: www.mathmagic.com

MathMagic is a mathematical WYSIWYG equation editor.

== History ==
In June 2012, "MathMagic Lite Edition" was introduced for macOS platforms, with some limited features.

In 2013, Adobe bundled a custom version of MathMagic to Adobe Captivate 7 for both macOS and Windows.

In September 2014, "MathMagic Lite for Windows" was released.

In 2022, the 64-bit versions of MathMagic for macOS were released in Universal binary format for both Intel Macs and M1 Apple silicon Macs.

== Features ==
MathMagic supports MathML, LaTeX, Plain TeX, PDF, SVG, MathType equations, Equation to Speech, and others.

MathMagic does not support computation.

Its website supports the HTTP protocol, not the more secure HTTPS.

== See also ==
- Formula editor
- MathML
- LaTeX
- ASCIIMathML
- MathType
- Microsoft Word 2007 equation editor
