= MathType =

Software application for mathematical notation

- Developer: Design Science
- Release: June 23, 1987; 39 years ago
- Stable release: 7.11.1.462 / January 22, 2026; 6 months ago
- Operating system: Microsoft Windows macOS
- Available in: English, French, German, Japanese, Chinese and Croatian
- Type: Formula editor
- License: Trialware
- Website: https://www.wiris.com/en/mathtype/

MathType is a software application created by Design Science that allows the creation of mathematical notation for inclusion in desktop and web applications.

After Design Science was acquired by Maths for More in 2017, their WIRIS web equation editor software was rebranded as MathType.

== Features ==
MathType is a graphical editor for mathematical equations that allows entry with the mouse and keyboard in a full graphical WYSIWYG environment. This contrasts to document markup languages such as LaTeX where equations are entered as markup in a text editor and then processed into a typeset document as a separate step.

MathType also supports the math markup languages TeX and MathML. MathType can be configured so that LaTeX can be entered directly in the editor, and MathType equations in Microsoft Word can be converted to and from LaTeX. MathType also supports copying to and pasting from either of these markup languages.

Additionally, on Windows 7 and later, equations may be drawn using a touch screen or pen (or mouse) via the math input panel.

By default, MathType equations are typeset in Times New Roman, with Symbol used for symbols and Greek. Equations may also be typeset in Euclid, a modern font like Computer Modern used in TeX, and this is included with the software. Roman characters (i.e., variable names and functions) may be typeset in any font that contains those characters, but Greek and symbols will still use Times or Euclid.

=== Support for other applications ===
On Windows, MathType supports object linking and embedding (OLE), which is the standard Windows mechanism for including information from one application in another. In particular, office suites such as Microsoft Office and OpenOffice.org for Windows allow MathType equations to be embedded in this way. Equations embedded using OLE are displayed and printed as graphics in the host application and can be edited later, in which case the host document is updated automatically. A Microsoft Word add-in is also included, and it adds features for equation numbering and equation formatting.

There is no standard analogous OLE on the Mac, so support for equation embedding is not universal. Microsoft Office for Mac supports OLE, so MathType equations may be used there as usual. MathType has support for Apple iWork '09, so equations may be embedded and updated seamlessly in that product too. In applications where no other possibility is available, such as OpenOffice.org for Mac, Design Science recommends exporting equations as images and embedding those images into documents. As on Windows, there is a plugin for Microsoft Word for Mac (except for Word 2008) that adds equation formatting features such as equation numbering. AppleWorks included a special version of MathType for built-in equation editing.

For Web applications such as Gmail and Google Docs, MathType supports copying to (and pasting from) HTML <img> tags (created by translating the equation's LaTeX into Google Chart API). There is a list of web application presets in the Copy Preferences dialog, so for example choosing "Google Docs" would copy as an HTML <img> tag, whereas choosing "Wikipedia" would copy as LaTeX wrapped in a <math> wiki tag.

== Version history ==
Since the initial introduction in 1987, Design Science has released many new versions of MathType, the last in 2019. This article describes the now abandoned Design Science version on MathType. After acquiring MathType, WIRIS rebranded a different equation editor with the MathType name, and it has substantially different functionality compared to the Design Science version. There has been widespread criticism among MathType users noting that the new MathType is inferior to the original software produced by Design Science.

== See also ==
- MathJax
- MathML
- MathMagic
