= Firemath =

Open source software

- Initial release: September 23, 2008
- Final release: 0.9 / 18 May 2012; 13 years ago
- Written in: JavaScript
- Platform: Cross-platform
- Type: Formula editor
- License: Open source (GPL v3)
- Website: www.firemath.info

Firemath is a discontinued WYSIWYG equation editor which generates MathML. It was open source software published under the GNU General Public License (GPL) version 3. Firemath was an add-on for the web browser Firefox. It uses the rendering facilities of the browser.

Firemath is incompatible with the Firefox Quantum release (Version 57.0) from November 2017 and with all later releases. The add-on was removed from addons.mozilla.org and is not available elsewhere.

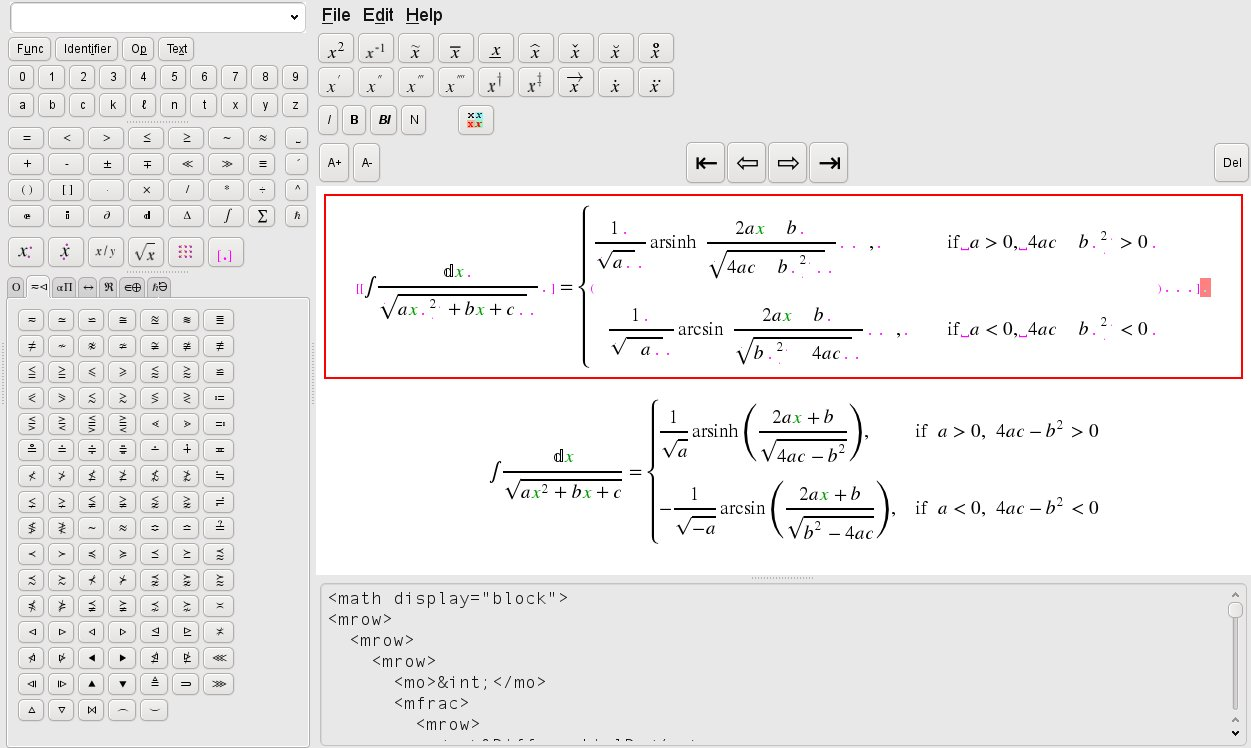
Firemath screenshot

== Features ==
Firemath must be installed as an addon into the Firefox browser. After invocation it opens in a new tab. The following list summarizes the main features of the software.

- Firemath supports a large number of mathematical symbols, operators and arrows.
- The majority of the MathML 2 presentation markup elements are supported.
- While editing equations these are displayed in two formats simultaneously, namely properly rendered and with editing elements added.
- Equations can be saved in MathML format or as bitmap images. The same is true for copying equations to the clipboard.
- When saving/copying MathML the user can choose between XHTML or HTML5.
- Some editing can be done using the keyboard, while all elements can be accessed using the mouse.
- Simple LaTeX expressions are interpreted.
- MathML equations on web pages can be opened in Firemath via the context menu (right click) of the equations.
