= MathCast =

Graphical mathematics equation editor

- Developer(s): Tomer Chakam
- Stable release: 0.92 / March 20, 2013
- Operating system: Microsoft Windows
- Type: Equation Editor
- License: GNU General Public License
- Website: mathcast.sf.net

MathCast is a graphical mathematics equation editor. With this computer application, a user can create equations in mathematical notation and use them in documents or web pages. Equations can be rendered into pictures or transformed into MathML.

MathCast features a Rapid Mathline, Equation List Management, and XHTML authoring.

MathCast is a free software application distributed under the GNU General Public License.
