= Global Digital Mathematics Library =

The Global Digital Mathematics Library (GDML) was a project organized under the auspices of the International Mathematical Union (IMU) to establish a digital library focused on mathematics, following on to the idea of a World Digital Mathematical Library proposed to the International Mathematical Union in 2006. The GDML was discussed by panels at the 2014 and 2018 International Congress of Mathematicians, and produced a white paper. Successor projects, the International Mathematical Knowledge Trust and European Knowledge Infrastructure for Mathematics, were initiated in 2016.

== See also ==
- Mathematical knowledge management
