= Frank Pfenning =

German-American computer scientist

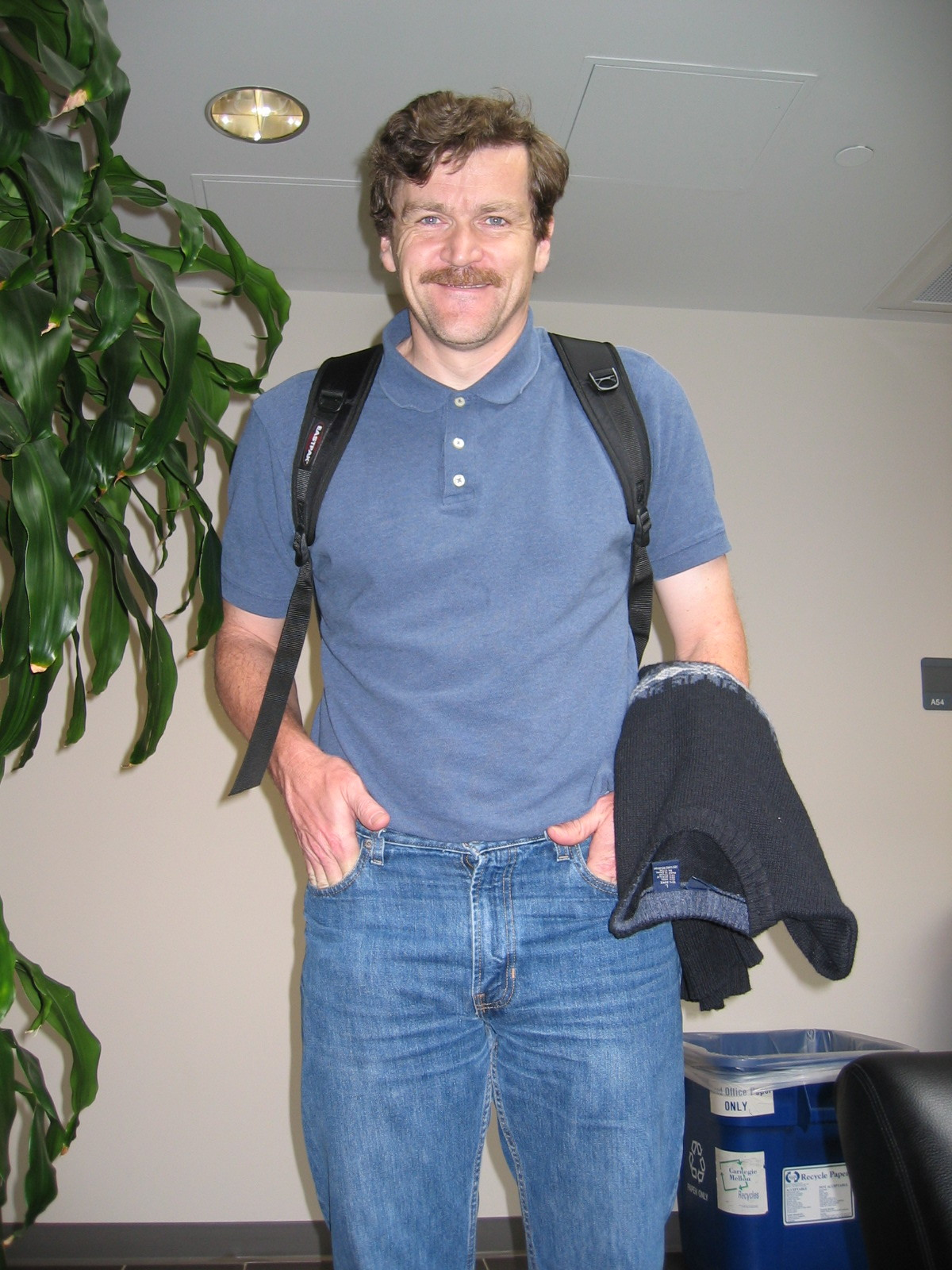
- Mathematical Foundations of Programming Semantics (Pittsburgh, May 2004)
- Born: Rüsselsheim am Main, Germany
- Education: Technische Universität Darmstadt; Carnegie Mellon University
- Spouse: Nancy Pfenning
- Awards: ACM Fellow (2015)
- Scientific career
- Workplaces: Carnegie Mellon University
- Thesis: Proof Transformations in Higher-Order Logic (1987)
- Doctoral advisor: Peter B. Andrews
- Doctoral students: Michael Kohlhase; Gerald Penn; Brigitte Pientka; Christoph Benzmüller
- Website: http://www.cs.cmu.edu/~fp/

Frank Pfenning is a German-American professor of computer science, adjunct professor in philosophy, and was head of the Computer Science Department at Carnegie Mellon University from 2013 to 2018.

== Education and career ==
Pfenning grew up in Rüsselsheim in Germany and studied mathematics and computer science at Technische Universität Darmstadt in Germany. He attended Carnegie Mellon University after receiving a Fulbright Scholarship, and subsequently became a professor in Carnegie Mellon's Computer Science Department.

His research includes work in the area of programming languages, logic and type theory, logical frameworks, automated deduction, and trustworthy computing. He is one of the principal authors of the Twelf system. He also developed Carnegie Mellon's introductory imperative programming course for undergraduates and the C0 programming language used in this course.

== Honors and awards ==
In 2015, he was named a Fellow of the Association for Computing Machinery "for contributions to the logical foundations of automatic theorem proving and types for programming languages." In 2016, he received the LICS Test of Time Award for the paper "A Linear Logical Framework", co-authored with Iliano Cervesato.

== Personal life ==
Pfenning is a competitive squash player, ranked in the top five of the university's squash ladder.

Pfenning has also appeared in an experimental film alongside Sharon Needles.
