= AMSRefs =

The AMSRefs package is an extension package for LaTeX that facilitates the creation of bibliographies and citations in LaTeX documents. Use of AMSRefs allows for the retention of rich markup that makes references easier to reuse in other publishing environments, such as on the Web, in other book or journal formats, or with citation services. The package is available for free on the American Mathematical Society's website.

The purpose of AMSRefs is to provide a simpler, more flexible way to use many of the bibliography and citation features that users of LaTeX and BibTeX have come to expect. AMSRefs has been designed to encourage the preservation of structured markup of the bibliography throughout the entire lifetime of a document, from rough draft to final archival version. It does this by replacing the unstructured .bbl file format of LaTeX by a fully structured format. The package is compatible with the “showkeys”, “hyperref”, and “backrefs” packages and implements the functionality of the “cite” package. AMSRefs provides that the bibliography style is controlled completely through LaTeX instead of being determined partly by a BibTeX style file and partly through LaTeX. The same data format is used in the database file and in the LaTeX document. Thus an AMSRefs-format database is a valid LaTeX document that can be printed directly. Also, an author can send an article with embedded references to a publisher without any loss of internal structural information about the entries. It is possible to use the AMSRefs package without abandoning one's existing BibTeX database files.

AMSRefs may be distributed and/or modified under the LaTeX Project Public License, either version 1.3c of this license or (at your option) any later version.
