= Formula editor =

Computer program used to typeset mathematical works or formulae

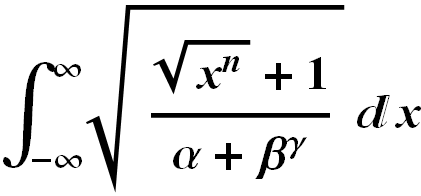
A typeset mathematical expression

A formula editor, also known as an equation editor, is a computer program that is used to typeset mathematical formulas and mathematical expressions.

Formula editors typically serve two purposes:

- They allow word processing and publication of technical content either for print publication, or to generate raster images for web pages or screen presentations.
- They provide a means for users to specify input to computational systems that is easier to read and check than plain text input and output from computational systems that is easy to understand or ready for publication.

Content for formula editors can be provided manually using a markup language, e.g. TeX or MathML, via a point-and-click GUI, or as computer generated results from symbolic computations such as Mathematica.

Typical features include the ability to nest fractions, radicals, superscripts, subscripts, overscripts and underscripts together with special characters such as mathematical symbols, arrows and scalable parentheses.

Some systems are capable of re-formatting formulae into simpler forms or to adjust line-breaking automatically, while preserving the mathematical meaning of a formula.

== Notable examples ==
Name	Platform	Output formats	TeX support	MathML support	Drawing / annotation support	Computation support	Notes
Firemath (discontinued)			No	Yes	No	No	Addon for the Firefox web browser.
Ket		KET, TXT, PNG, LaTeX, HTML	Partial	No	No	Yes	Provides commands to enable the user to solve back-of-the-envelope calculations
LibreOffice Math	Linux, macOS, Windows	PDF, MathML	No	Yes	No	No	
MathMagic	Windows, macOS, Android, iOS	PDF, SVG, EPS, PNG, JPG, BMP, GIF, PICT, WMF, TIFF, LaTeX, MathML, ASCIIMath, Zoho	Yes	Yes	No	Yes, via WolframAlpha	Interoperates with MS Word, Wolfram Alpha, MathJax, Google Docs, MathType, Wiki equations
MathCast			No	Yes	No	No	Open source
MathType	Windows, macOS	WMF, EPS, GIF	Partial	Yes	No	No	Integrates with Microsoft Office through OLE
Radical Pie	Windows	SVG, PDF, EMF, PIE	Partial	No	Yes	No	Integrates with Microsoft Office through OLE

== See also ==
- TeX, a typesetting system designed and mostly written by Donald Knuth
- LaTeX, a document markup language and document preparation system for the TeX typesetting program
- MathML, an application of XML for describing mathematical notations and capturing both its structure and content. It aims at integrating mathematical formulae into World Wide Web pages and other documents. It is a recommendation of the W3C math working group
- Mathematical software
- List of open-source software for mathematics
- OfficeMath
