= Christoph Benzmüller =

German computer scientist

Christoph Ewald Benzmüller
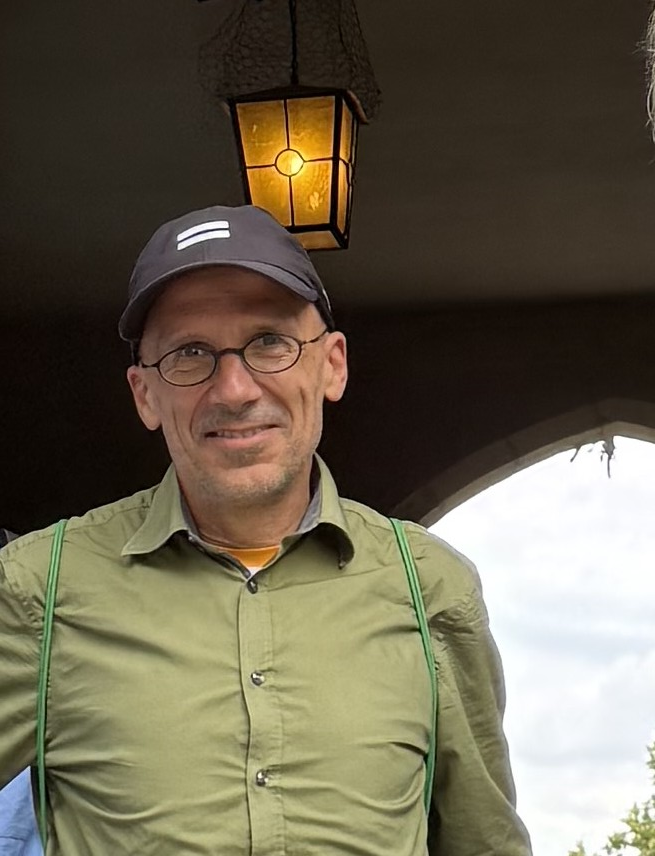
- Benzmüller in Bamberg (2025)
- Born: 1968 (age 57–58)
- Education: Saarland University
- Known for: Formal reasoning Theorem proving
- Scientific career
- Workplaces: University of Bamberg; FU Berlin
- Thesis: Equality and Extensionality in Higher-Order Theorem Proving (1999)
- Doctoral advisor: Jörg H. Siekmann; Michael Kohlhase; Frank Pfenning

Christoph Ewald Benzmüller (born 1968) is a German computer scientist whose research interests include formalisation of rational arguments by using symbolic artificial intelligence. He has been professor at the University of Bamberg since 2022, in charge of the chair for AI Systems Engineering, and at the FU Berlin since 2021.

== Education and career ==
Benzmüller studied computer science at Saarland University from 1989. He completed his studies in 1995 with a diploma. He then completed his doctorate under Jörg H. Siekmann in 1999 on the subject of Equality and Extensionality in Higher-Order Theorem Proving, supervised by Michael Kohlhase and Frank Pfenning. After spending time abroad in Birmingham and Edinburgh, he worked as a university lecturer at Saarland University from 2001 to 2008, including a research stay in Cambridge. He was then a professor at the International University in Germany in Bruchsal until 2009. Benzmüller gained his habilitation at Saarland University in 2008 and at the FU Berlin in 2012. After research stays in Stanford and Luxembourg, he has been an apl. professor at the FU Berlin since 2021. In February 2022, he accepted an appointment at the University of Bamberg.

== Recognition ==
Benzmüller conducts research at the intersection of artificial intelligence, philosophy, mathematics and language processing. On the one hand, he is interested in formal reasoning and universal logic with applications in philosophy/metaphysics and mathematics, and on the other hand in the development of hybrid AI technologies for the ethical and legal control of AI systems. In the context of research stays and visiting professorships, he has established collaborations with numerous international institutions, including University of Luxembourg, Stanford University (USA), University of Cambridge (UK), Carnegie Mellon University (USA), BITS Pilani Dubai (UAE) and Zhejiang University (China). He serves on various international committees, advises AI start-ups, is the national contact person for the Confederation of Laboratories for Artificial Intelligence Research in Europe (CLAIRE-AI), member of the Graduate School Berlin Mathematical Research Centre (MATH+) and the Federation of German Scientists.

He is best known for his work on formalising Gödel's ontological proof in 2014, 2025 and verifying the theorems using automated theorem proving with Isabelle in 2016. The proof could be confirmed by researchers from TU Vienna. For the formalisation and the proof, Benzmüller gained attention by the national press and internationally across interdisciplinary researchers.

== Personal life ==
In his private life, Benzmüller is a competitive athlete and won several championships in his youth as a long-distance runner and hurdler. He is married and has three children.
