= AsciiMath =

Mathematical markup language

AsciiMath is a client-side mathematical markup language for displaying mathematical expressions in web browsers.

== Details ==
Using the JavaScript script ASCIIMathML.js, AsciiMath notation is converted to MathML at the time the page is loaded by the browser, natively in Mozilla Firefox, Safari, and via a plug-in in IE7. The simplified markup language supports a subset of the LaTeX language instructions, as well as a less verbose syntax (which, for example, replaces "\times" with "xx" or "times" to produce the "×" symbol). The resulting MathML mathematics can be styled by applying CSS to class "mstyle".

The script ASCIIMathML.js is freely available under the MIT License. The latest version also includes support for SVG graphics, natively in Mozilla Firefox and via a plug-in in IE7.

Per May 2009 there is a new version available. This new version still contains the original ASCIIMathML and LaTeXMathML as developed by Peter Jipsen, but the ASCIIsvg part has been extended with linear-logarithmic, logarithmic-linear, logarithmic-logarithmic, polar graphs and pie charts, normal and stacked bar charts, different functions like integration and differentiation and a series of event trapping functions, buttons and sliders, in order to create interactive lecture material and exams online in web pages.

ASCIIMathML.js has been integrated into MathJax, starting with MathJax v2.0.

== Example ==
The well-known quadratic formula

$$x=\frac{-b \pm \sqrt{b^2 - 4ac}}{2a}$$

looks like this in AsciiMath:

x=(-b +- sqrt(b^2 – 4ac))/(2a)
