= KaTeX =

JavaScript library for displaying math notation

- Stable release: 0.19.0 / 1 October 2026; 15 days ago
- Written in: JavaScript
- Operating system: Cross-platform
- Type: Mathematical software
- License: MIT License
- Website: katex.org
- Repository: github.com/KaTeX/KaTeX

KaTeX is a cross-browser JavaScript library that displays mathematical notation in web browsers. It puts special emphasis on being fast and easy to use.

It was initially developed by Khan Academy, and became one of the top five trending projects on GitHub in September 2014.

== Features ==
KaTeX rendering of math claims to be:

- Fast: It renders its math synchronously and doesn't need to reflow the page.
- Print quality: Its layout is based on TeX.
- Self contained: It has no dependencies, so it can be easily bundled.
- Capable of server-side rendering: it has an option to generate HTML on the server (so, for example, one can pre-render expressions using Node.js and send them as plain HTML).

KaTeX implements a smaller subset of LaTeX's mathematical notation features than MathJax.

== See also ==
- MathML
