= AMS-LaTeX =

LaTeX additions for the American Mathematical Society

- Stable release: AMS-LaTeX v2.20, AMS-TeX v2.2, AMSFonts v3.0
- Written in: LaTeX, TeX
- Operating system: Unix-like, Windows
- Platform: TeX Live, MiKTeX
- Type: Computer library
- License: LaTeX Project Public License
- Website: www.ams.org/arc/resources/amslatex-about.html

AMS-LaTeX is a collection of LaTeX document classes and packages developed for the American Mathematical Society (AMS). Its additions to LaTeX include the typesetting of multi-line and other mathematical statements, document classes, and fonts containing numerous mathematical symbols.

It has largely superseded the plain TeX macro package AMS-TeX. AMS-TeX was originally written by Michael Spivak, and was used by the AMS from 1983 to 1985.

MathJax supports AMS-LaTeX through extensions.

The following code of the LaTeX2e produces the AMS-LaTeX logo:

 %%% -- AMS-LaTeX_logo.tex -------
 \documentclass{article}
 \usepackage{amsmath}
 
 \begin{document}
 \AmS-\LaTeX
 \end{document}

The package has a suite of facilities to format multi-line equations. For example, the following code,

  \begin{align}
    y &= (x+1)^2 \\
      &= x^2+2x+1
  \end{align}

causes the equals signs in the two lines to be aligned with one another, like this:

$$\begin{align}
y &= (x+1)^2 \\
&= x^2+2x+1
\end{align}$$

AMS-LaTeX also includes many flexible commands for formatting and numbering theorems, lemmas, etc. For example, one may use the environment theorem

  \begin{theorem}[Pythagoras] Suppose $a\leq b\leq c$ are the side-lengths of a right triangle.\\  Then $a^2+b^2=c^2$.\end{theorem}
  \begin{proof}. . . \end{proof}

to generate

Theorem (Pythagoras) Suppose $a\leq b\leq c$ are the side-lengths of a right triangle.
Then $a^2+b^2=c^2$.
Proof. . . □

== See also ==
- List of TeX extensions
- AMSRefs
- Tombstone (typography)
