= MKM Educational Trust =

Indian educational trust

- Type: Non-Government Organization
- Established: 1993
- Location: Thirukkalachery, India

MKM Educational Trust ("Trust") is a non-profit and non-governmental Indian-based trust foundation established and founded by MKM Aboobakar.

== History ==
On 25 October 1993, the trust was originally registered in Tranquebar (now known as Tharangambadi), in Tamil Nadu, India with the Society Ordnance Department of Tamil Nadu Government, India under the name of "Memuka Foundation" as a charitable trust. "Memuka" is short for "Menamuna Kassim”.

Then on 3 November 1998 the name was further expanded to its origin and had been changed and registered with the same Registration Department as "Menamuna Kassim Memorial Trust". This is popularly known as "MKM Trust".

Since MKM Trust’s objective was to provide the best English-medium education to the educationally backward communities who are poor, the name was changed to suit its purpose as "MKM Educational Trust" on 22 August 2011.

== Objectives ==
The trust was initially set up to provide quality English-medium education to poor young Muslim girls from educationally backward community and also to prevent them from marrying at their early tender age. But now the trust focuses on rural areas, especially the poor, irrespective of their religious or social background, so that they can compete at a national and international level.

== Works done ==
MKM Educational Trust has been giving the best education and achieving its aims through its educational institution called, Aiyas Matriculation Higher Secondary School, a government recognized institution, in the village of Thirukkalachery since 1989.

In May 2010, MKM Educational Trust opened its second school called Aiyas English School in the city of Karaikal providing classes from Kindergarten until 5th Standard using CBSE (Central Board of Secondary Education) system

== The managing trustee ==
The managing trustee of this trust is Mr. MKM Aboobakar.
