= All-Russian Mathematical Portal =

All-Russian Mathematical portal
- Available in: English, Russian
- Country of origin: Russia
- Website: https://www.mathnet.ru/

The All-Russian Mathematical Portal (better known as Math-Net.Ru) is a web portal that provides extensive access to all aspects of Russian mathematics, including journals, organizations, conferences, articles, videos, libraries, software, and people. The portal is a joint project of the Steklov Mathematical Institute and the Russian Academy of Sciences. Access to information in the portal is generally free, except for the full-text sources of certain publications which have elected to make their content available on a fee basis.

The website can be read in either Russian or English. As a standard default, it renders on-screen mathematics using MathJax.

== See also ==
- MathSciNet
- Zentralblatt MATH
