= International Mathematical Knowledge Trust =

The International Mathematical Knowledge Trust (IMKT) is an international organization under construction, with the goal to make available the totality of mathematical knowledge in digital form. The organization will work in a partnership between International Mathematical Union, University of Waterloo and Alfred P. Sloan Foundation.
