= Thirukkalacherry =

- Village
- Location in Tamil Nadu, India Thirukkalacherry (India)
- Coordinates: 11.009335°N 79.80465°E
- Country: India
- State: Tamil Nadu
- District: Mayiladuthurai

Languages
  - Official: Tamil
- Time zone: UTC+5:30 (IST)
- PIN: 609 312
- Telephone code: 91 4364
- Vehicle registration: TN 51

Thirukkalachery is a small village in Mayiladuthurai District, Tranquebar (Tharangambadi) Taluk, Tamil Nadu, India.

See: The Taluk Map of Tranquebar (Tharangambadi)

== Transport and communication ==
Thirukkalachery is well-connected with other major towns in the region, such as Porayar which is the nearest town and links with Karaikal, Mayiladuthurai, Sirkali, Nagapattinam and Tiruchirappalli.

The nearest international airport is at Tiruchirapalli, which is 150 kilometres from Thirukkalachery and Chennai International Airport is approx. 300 kilometers away. There are regular government and private bus services to Chennai. Nearest Railway Junction is also at Mayiladuthurai.

== Economy ==
Agriculture is the main activity in this area as this is a cultivation rich land. Rice, sugarcane, coconut and banana plantation are the main products. This is a small village with about ten to twenty shops along Thirukkalachery's Main Road.

== Landmark ==
*the famous #sri seethala devi Mariyaman temple situated here. One of grand temple.

- The famous naganathaswamy temple also situated here.(the Siva temple).
- The famous petti kaliyaman temple also situated here.
- The famous Vinayagar temple situated here.
- Mohaideen Andavar Mosque - This is the biggest mosque (also called Pallivasal) in Mayiladuthurai District.
1. Experiment ideas Tamil YouTube channel foundation office in situated here .
2. Fashion tailor Shop situated here .

== Schools ==
There are four Schools in this village:-

- Aided Elementary School, Thirukkalachery.
- Aiyas Matriculation Higher Secondary School, Thirukkalachery.
- Hameediya Higher Secondary School, Thirukkalachery.
- Hameediya Free Nursery & Primary School, Thirukkalachery.
