= Mathematical knowledge management =

Study of how society can effectively make use of mathematical literature

Mathematical knowledge management (MKM) is the study of how society can effectively make use of the vast and growing literature on mathematics. It studies approaches such as databases of mathematical knowledge, automated processing of formulae and the use of semantic information, and artificial intelligence. Mathematics is particularly suited to a systematic study of automated knowledge processing due to the high degree of interconnectedness between different areas of mathematics.

== See also ==
- OMDoc
- QED manifesto
- Areas of mathematics
- MathML
