= Google Chart API =

Online data charting service

- Original author: Google
- Release: 2007
- Final release: February 2010
- Available in: HTTP requests
- Website: developers.google.com/chart

The Google Chart API was a non-interactive Web service that created graphical charts from user-supplied data. Google servers created a PNG image of a chart from data and formatting parameters specified by a user's HTTP request. The service supported a wide variety of chart information and formatting. Users could conveniently embed these charts in a Web page by using a simple image tag.

Originally the API was Google's internal tool to support rapid embedding of charts within Google's own applications (like Google Finance for example). Google figured it would be a useful tool to open up to web developers. It officially launched on December 6, 2007.

Line, bar, pie, and radar charts, as well as Venn diagrams, scatter plots, sparklines, maps, google-o-meters, and QR codes were supported.

Google deprecated the API in 2012 with guaranteed availability until April 2015. On March 18, 2019 Google turned off the API. Google recommends the successor service Google Charts.

== Example ==
The following URL creates the pie chart below:
http://chart.apis.google.com/chart?
chs=200x200
&chdlp=b
&chtt=Uberman
&chdl=Asleep|Awake
&chd=t:1,11,1,11,1,11,1,11,1,11,1,11
&cht=p
&chco=586F8E,7D858F,586F8E,7D858F,586F8E,7D858F,586F8E,7D858F,586F8E,7D858F,586F8E,7D858F

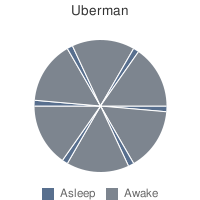

== External Libraries ==
Instead of creating the URL request manually, there are many open source libraries available for most programming languages.

| Platform | Name | Website |
|---|---|---|
| Java | Google Chart API wrapper | https://code.google.com/p/googlechartwrapper/ |
| Java | charts4j | https://code.google.com/p/charts4j/ |
| C#/.NET | ngchart | https://code.google.com/p/ngchart/ |
| Ruby | gchart | https://web.archive.org/web/20100618222849/http://rubyforge.org/projects/gchart/ |
| Python | google-chartwrapper | https://code.google.com/p/google-chartwrapper/ |
| PHP | gchartphp | https://github.com/pacbard/gChartPhp |

== See also ==
- Comparison of JavaScript charting libraries
- List of information graphics software
