= List of acronyms: Y =

This list contains acronyms, initialisms, and pseudo-blends that begin with the letter Y.

For the purposes of this list:

- acronym = an abbreviation pronounced as if it were a word, e.g., SARS = severe acute respiratory syndrome, pronounced to rhyme with cars
- initialism = an abbreviation pronounced wholly or partly using the names of its constituent letters, e.g., CD = compact disc, pronounced cee dee
- pseudo-blend = an abbreviation whose extra or omitted letters mean that it cannot stand as a true acronym, initialism, or portmanteau (a word formed by combining two or more words).

(a) = acronym, e.g.: SARS – (a) severe acute respiratory syndrome
(i) = initialism, e.g.: CD – (i) compact disc
(p) = pseudo-blend, e.g.: UNIFEM – (p) United Nations Development Fund for Women
(s) = symbol (none of the above, representing and pronounced as something else; for example: MHz – megahertz)

Some terms are spoken as either acronym or initialism, e.g., VoIP, pronounced both as voyp and V-O-I-P.

(Main list of acronyms)

- y – (s) Yocto-
- Y – (s) Yotta – Yttrium

== Y0–9 ==
- Y2K – (i) Year Two Thousand

== YA ==
- yA – (s) Yoctoampere
- Ya – (s) Yottayear
- YA
  - (s) Yottaampere
  - (i) Young Adult
- YAC – (a/i) Youth-Adult Committee
- YAFLA – (a) Yet Another Five Letter Abbreviation
- YAP – (a) Young Aspiring Professional
- YaBPr – (a) Yet another Brother Pat rant
- YABSLAG – (a) Yet another boy singing like a girl

== YB ==
- Yb – (s) Ytterbium
- YB – (i) Youcef Benzouada (Southern Algerian name)

== YC ==
- yC – (s) Yoctocoulomb
- YC – (s) Yottacoulomb

== YD ==
- YD – (s) People's Democratic Republic of Yemen (ISO 3166 digram, obsolete 1990)
- YDS – (i) Yosemite Decimal System (climbing)

== YE ==
- YE – (s) Yemen (ISO 3166 digram)
- YEM – (s) Yemen (ISO 3166 trigram) – Manitowaning/Manitoulin East Municipal Airport IATA airport code
- YER – (s) Yemeni rial (ISO 4217 currency code)

== YF ==
- yF – (s) Yoctofarad
- YF – (s) Yottafarad

== YG ==
- yg – (s) Yoctogram
- Yg – (s) Yottagram
- YGM – You've got mail
- Ygo – (i) Yu-Gi-Oh!
- YGCO – (i) Yamaneko Group of Comet Observers

== YH ==
- yH – (s) Yoctohenry
- YH – (s) Yottahenry
- YHS – Ya Hoor sur!
- YHBT – (i) You Have Been Trolled
- YHIH1 – (a) You Heard It Here First (lowercase: yhih1, pronounced yi-hi)
- YHII – You Have It Inside

== YI ==
- yi – (s) Yiddish language (ISO 639-1 code)
- Yi – (s) Yobi
- YI – (s) Serbia and Montenegro (deprecated FIPS 10-4 country code, now RB (Serbia) and MJ (Montenegro))
- yid – (s) Yiddish language (ISO 639-2 code)
- YIH – (a) Yiff In Hell
- YILP – (a) Youth Integration Livelihood Improvement Project
- Yippie – (p) Youth International Party + suffix

== YJ ==
- yJ – (s) Yoctojoule
- YJ – (s) Yottajoule

== YK ==
- yK – (s) Yoctokelvin
- YK – (s) Yottakelvin
- YKYFCW – You know you're from Christchurch when (post-earthquake joke)

== YL ==
- yL – (s) Yoctolitre
- YL – (s) Yottalitre

== YM ==
- ym – (s) Yoctometre
- Ym – (s) Yottametre
- YM – (s) Yemen (FIPS 10-4 country code) – (i) Your Magazine (originally Young Miss, later Young & Modern)
- YMCA – (i) Young Men's Christian Association
- YMD – (s) People's Democratic Republic of Yemen (ISO 3166 trigram, obsolete 1990)
- YMMD – (i) You Make My Day
- YMMV – (i) Your Mileage May Vary (adapted from the EPA's automobile mileage estimates, where it is used to convey the original meaning, "results may vary"); but (now) when used as an idiom, it -- (either the acronym "YMMV" or the 4 words) -- can instead mean (this e.g. comes from wikt:your mileage may vary#Phrase:) "this is just my opinion, your opinion may be different".

== YN ==
- yN – (s) Yoctonewton
- YN – (s) Yottanewton
- YNWA – reference to Liverpool F.C.'s sports anthem, the 1945 show tune You'll Never Walk Alone

== YO ==
- yo – (s) Yoruba language (ISO 639-1 code)
- YO – (s) former Yugoslavia (NATO country code, obsolete 1993)
- YOLO – (a) You Only Live Once
- yor – (s) Yoruba language (ISO 639-2 code)

== YP ==
- YPA – (i) Yards per Pass Attempt (football statistic)
- YPG – (i) Yekîneyên Parastina Gel (Kurdish, "People's Protection Units" or "People's Defense Units")
- YPIO – (a) Your Problem Is Obvious
- YPO – (a) Young Presidents' Organization

== YR ==
- YRR – (i) "Young, Restless, and Reformed", an alternative name for the New Calvinist movement

== YS ==
- ys – (s) Yoctosecond
- yS – (s) Yoctosiemens
- Ys – (s) Yottasecond
- YS – (s) Yottasiemens
- YSA
  - (i) Young Single Adult, a designation used by the LDS Church for single adults under 30
  - Young Socialist Alliance
  - Youth Service America

== YT ==
- yT – (s) Yoctotesla
- YT
  - (s) Mayotte (ISO 3166 digram)
  - Yottatesla
  - Yukon Territory (postal symbol)
- YTD – (i) Year-To-Date
- YTM – (i) Yield to Maturity
- YTS – (i) Youth Training Scheme
- YTT – Yoshi Topsy-Turvy
- YT – YouTube

== YU ==
- YU
  - (i) York University
  - (s) former Yugoslavia (ISO 3166 digram, obsolete 2003)
- YUG – (s) former Yugoslavia (ISO 3166 trigram, obsolete 2003)
- Yuppie – (p) Young Urban Professional + suffix

== YV ==
- yV – (s) Yoctovolt
- YV – (s) Yottavolt

== YW ==
- yW – (s) Yoctowatt
- YW – (s) Yottawatt
- YWCA – (i) Young Women's Christian Association
- YWMV – (i) Your Wallet May Vary (to convey "our budgets are different as far as what is affordable / justifiable")

== YY ==
- YYH
  - (i) YuYu Hakusho
  - (s) Taloyoak Airport, IATA airport code
- YYK – (i) Yeah you know
