= Department of Biology, University of York =

University academic department in the UK

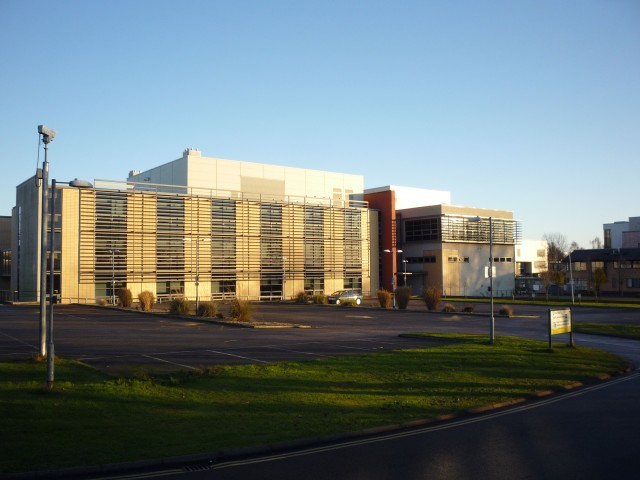
- Biology Buildings on Campus West
- Type: Academic department
- Established: 1965
- Affiliations: University of York
- Head of Department: Professor James Chong
- Academic staff: 70
- Total staff: 300
- Students: 1000
- Location: York, Yorkshire, England
- Website: www.york.ac.uk/biology/

The Department of Biology at the University of York opened in 1965 and moved to its current site near Wentworth College in 1968. The department provides both undergraduate and postgraduate courses in Biology and other related fields of science to over 1000 students and has been rated consistently ranked in the top 10 university biology departments in the UK. The department is involved in interdisciplinary teaching with other departments of the university, including the chemistry department, which together co-teach biochemistry courses.

== Research ==
=== Biology Research Centres ===
==== York Biomedical Research Institute ====
The York Biomedical Research Institute (YBRI) consists of over 100 principal investigators across the university's biology department, the Hull York Medical School, and the York & Scarborough Teaching Hospitals NHS foundation. The main aim of the research group is to advance discoveries in biomedical research. The centre also has research groups focused on researching Immunology, haematology, and infection as well as Neuroscience.

==== Molecular and cellular medicine ====
Molecular and cellular medicine has research strengths in chronic diseases and healthy aging with focuses on epithelial cancers, diabetes, and neurodegenerative disorders among others.

==== Jack Birch Unit for Molecular Carcinogenesis ====
The centre also hosts the Jack Birch Unit for Molecular Carcinogenesis researches epithelial cancers with a focus on bladder cancers. The research is supported by funding from York Against Cancer. In 2018 the unit published the evidence that cytochrome P450 (CYP) enzymes can active carcinogens locally in the bladder urothelium.

==== Centre for Novel Agricultural Products (CNAP) ====
Established in 1999, the Centre of Novel Agricultural Products (CNAP) conducts research focused on 'realising the potential of plant, microbial, and algal-based renewable resources through gene discovery'.

One of the key areas of research for the centre is developing sustainable crop practices and part of this research is looking in to the mechanisms of plant disease and how they can be prevented. One of the focuses is Ash die back. Another is using big data to understand more about how plants resist disease, led by Katherine J. Denby. The centre has also been crucial for the development of farming within shipping containers for Grow it York, which allows fresh vegetables to be grown in York city centre, reducing carbon footprint and wastage. The project also acts as a research point into the logistics of urban farming.

==== York Structural Biology Laboratory ====
Consisting of around 70 researchers, the York Structural Biology Laboratory (YSBL) is an interdisciplinary research centre with connections to the departments of Chemistry and Biology. The main focuses of the centre are determining the structures of various biological molecules including proteins, with this research having applications to enzymology for the production of biological ligands for use in medical research. The centre is also home to experimental research into crystallography developing and refining computer models that are now used world wide.

==== Leverhulme Centre for Anthropocene Biodiversity ====
The Leverhulme Centre for Anthropocene Biodiversity (LCAB) was formed as part of an effort by the University of St Andrews, University College London, University of York, and Université de Sherbrooke to understand and combat the consequences human activity is having on various ecosystems around the world. Research by the team has included developing strategies to combat the effects of climate change as well as improving palm oil practices, helping to reduce rainforest deforestation.

== Facilities ==
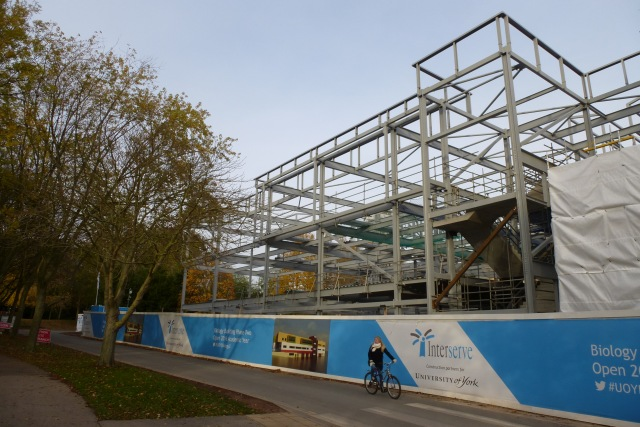
Biology Phase 2 construction

The Department of Biology is located on Campus West and currently consists of 15 blocks, with 4 blocks being completely allocated to research. A central atrium runs the length of the department, acting as the main communal space. The department houses a range of imaging and other facilities including the Eleanor and Guy Dodson Building, which houses state of the art crystallography, X-ray, NMR, cryoEM imaging machinery.

=== Phase I ===
Phase I started in 2013 consists of a building that is 780 sqm containing laboratory space and IT facilities and provides space for students on biomedical and Natural Sciences courses.

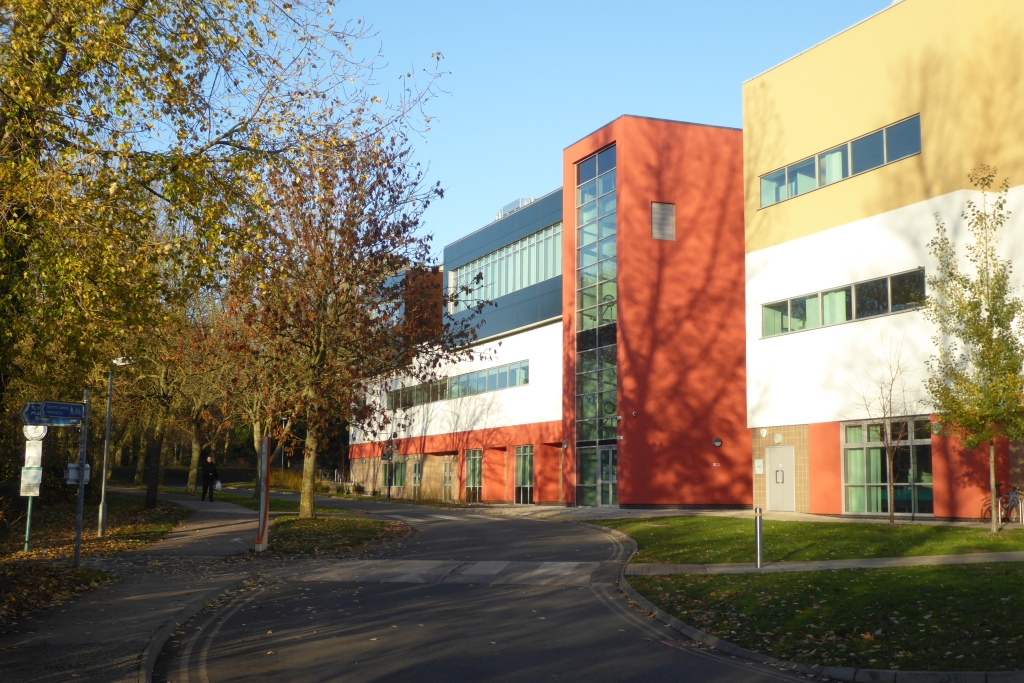
Outside of completed new building

=== Phase II ===
Phase II of the redevelopment of the biology department added an additional 1650 sqm of floor space mainly consisting of undergraduate teaching space as well as departmental administration and cost £9 million. The new development also contains the biology student creative lounge a study/social space for all students studying a bioscience degree.

== Associated departments & research centres ==
- Biochemistry
- Biological Physics and Biophysics
- Biological Physical Sciences Institute (BPSI)
- Bioscience Technology Facility
- York Jeol Nanocentre
- York Neuroimaging centre (YNiC)
- Centre for Hyperpolarisation in Magnetic Resonance (CHyM)
- York Plasma Institute (YPI)

== Awards ==
University of York's Biology department is currently ranked 7th in the UK for Biology by The Guardian in 2023. York also ranks 1st in the Russell Group for overall satisfaction in Biology. In 2014 the department was awarded with an Athena SWAN Gold Award for gender equality, which was most recently renewed in 2024.
