= Yemm =

Yemm is an English surname derived from an old word for uncle in its dialectal form from the Forest of Dean.

Notable people with the surname include:

- Jodie Yemm, Australian actress, best known for her roles in television soap operas
- Louis W. Yemm (died 1951), British-born organist in South Australia, associated with Cheer-Up Society and Violet Memory Day
- Norman Yemm (1933–2015), Australian actor, athlete and footballer, played Norm Baker in the television drama The Sullivans
- Richard Yemm, British inventor of the Pelamis Wave Energy Converter and CTO of Pelamis Wave Power
- Rick Yemm, Season 1 driver on American TV series Ice Road Truckers
- Steve Yemm, British politician

== See also ==
- Yamm (disambiguation)
- YEM (disambiguation)
- YMM (disambiguation)
