= Yorktown =

Yorktown or York Town may refer to:

== Places ==
=== Australia ===
- York Town, Tasmania

=== United Kingdom ===
- York Town, also known as Yorktown (and sometimes Yorkshiretown), a part of Camberley, Surrey (adjoining Sandhurst)
- York, North Yorkshire

=== United States ===
- Yorktown, Indiana
- Yorktown, Illinois
- Yorktown, New York
  - Yorktown Heights, New York, within Yorktown
- Yorktown, Texas
- Yorktown, Virginia

== Battles ==
- Siege of Yorktown (1781), during the American Revolutionary War
- Siege of Yorktown (1862), during the American Civil War

== Other uses ==
- Yorktown High School (disambiguation)
- USS Yorktown, any of several U.S. Navy ships
- "Yorktown (The World Turned Upside Down)", a song from the musical Hamilton
- SS Yorktown (1894)

== See also ==
- Yorkton (disambiguation)
