= Yap (disambiguation) =

Yap is an island in the Caroline Islands of the western Pacific Ocean. It may also refer to:

== Places ==
- Yap State, in the Federated States of Micronesia
- Yapen, island in Indonesia
- Yapen Islands Regency, regency in Papua province, Indonesia

== Science and technology ==
- Yap (company), an American technology company acquired by Amazon
- YAP (genetics), a mutation on the Y chromosome
- YAP (Prolog), an implementation of the Prolog programming language
- YAP (protein), a transcriptional co-activator
- Yet Another Previewer, a computer program to view DVI and PostScript files

== Other ==
- New Azerbaijan Party (Yeni Azərbaycan Partiyası)
- Yap International Airport, by IATA airport code
- Yap (slang); used when someone has talked at length, especially without significant meaning
- Yap, a Marvel Comics character and member of Technet

== People with the name ==
- Yap (surname), Hakka and Minnan romanization of the common Asian surname Ye
- Yap Ah Loy (1837–1885), founder of Kuala Lumpur, Malaysia
- Yap Kwan Seng (1846–1902), the last Chinese kapitan of Kuala Lumpur
- Yap Thiam Hien (1913–1989), Indonesian human rights advocate
- Yap Weng Wah (born 1983), Malaysian serial sex offender and hebephile
- Arthur Yap (1943–2006), Singaporean poet
- Arthur Yap (politician) (born 1965), Filipino politician
- James Yap (born 1982), Filipino professional basketball player
- John Yap (born 1959), British Columbia politician
- Kenny Yap, executive chairman of Qian Hu Corporation
- Miranda Yap (1948–2015), chemical engineer
- Pedro Yap (1918–2003), Chief Justice of the Philippines
- Richard Yap (born 1967), Filipino actor and businessman
- Roger Yap (born 1977), Filipino professional basketball player
- Tim Yap (born 1977), Filipino actor, TV and radio host

== See also ==
- Yapese language
- Yapp
- Yong (disambiguation)
