= YKS =

YKS may refer to:

== Aviation ==
- Waco YKS, two 1930s American biplane models
- Yakutsk Airport, Russia (by IATA code)

== Other uses ==
- Yokukansan, a Chinese herbal medicine
- Chapman code for Yorkshire, England
- Yuk Keep Smile, an Indonesian TV series from 2013 to 2014.

== See also ==
- YK (disambiguation)

== See also ==
- Waco YKS, a range of American single-engine biplanes
