= YHS =

YHS may refer to:

== Schools ==
- Yangjae High School, Seocho-dong, Seocho District, Seoul, Korea
- Yap High School in Yap, Federated States of Micronesia
- Yokota High School, Yokota Air Base, Japan
- Yorktown High School (disambiguation)
- Yorkville High School, Yorkville, Illinois
- Yosemite High School, Oakhurst, California
- Youngker High School, Buckeye, Arizona
- Youngsville High School, a public secondary school in Youngsville, Pennsylvania
- Ypsilanti High School, Ypsilanti Township, Michigan
- Yucaipa High School, Yucaipa, California

== Other ==
- A variant form of IHS symbolising the name of Jesus
- Yeo Hiap Seng, a drink manufacturer
- Sechelt Aerodrome, IATA code

== See also ==
- YHSS (disambiguation)
