= Young Muslims =

Young Muslims may refer to:

- Young Muslims (Islamic Circle of North America)
- Young Muslim Association, United States
- The Young Muslims UK
- Young Muslims (Yugoslavia)
- Young Muslims Association, Egypt
