= YMA =

YMA may refer to:

- Young Muslim Association, an organization for people of all ages that promotes Islam in America
- Mayo Airport, the IATA code for the airport in Canada
- Yilan Museum of Art, a museum in Yilan County, Taiwan
- Yma Súmac, a noted dramatic coloratura soprano of Peruvian origin, born September 13, 1922
- Young Mizo Association, an organization for the people of Mizo
