= Joram =

Joram may refer to:

- Joram (given name)
- Joram (film), a 2023 Indian thriller drama
- Jehoram (disambiguation) (meaning "God is exalted" in Biblical Hebrew)
- Joram, Arunachal Pradesh, a village panchayat in Arunachal Pradesh, India
- Joram MacRorie, a fictional character in the Deryni novels by Katherine Kurtz
- Joram, a fictional character in the Darksword novels by Margaret Weis and Tracy Hickman

== See also ==
- Jora (disambiguation)
