= Joram (given name) =

Joram (Hebrew: יורם) is a Jewish and African masculine given name. It may refer to the following notable people:

- Joram Gumbo, Zimbabwean politician
- Joram van Klaveren (born 1979), Dutch politician
- Joram Lindenstrauss (1936–2012), Israeli mathematician
- Joram Lürsen (born 1963), Dutch film and television director
- Joram Mariga (1927–2000), Zimbabwean sculptor
- Joram Mugume, Ugandan military officer
- Joram Piatigorsky (born 1940), American author, molecular biologist and eye researcher
- Joram Rozov (born 1938), Israeli artist
- Joram Shnider (born 1941), Israeli swimmer
