= YDS =

YDS or yds may refer to:

- YDS (Language Proficiency Test administered in Turkey)
- Yards
- YDS algorithm in computer science
- Yosemite Decimal System
- Young Democratic Socialists, US
- Yiddish Sign Language's ISO 639 code.
