= YPA =

YPA could refer to:

== Acronyms ==
- Yale Postdoctoral Association
- Yemen Ports Authority
- Yugoslav People's Army, 1945-1992
- Yukon Pickleball Association

== Other ==
- Yottapascal or YPa, used in measurement of pressure
- FC YPA, association football club from Ylivieska, Finland
- Prince Albert (Glass Field) Airport, Canada, IATA code

== See also ==
- Ura (disambiguation)
