= Yorkton (disambiguation) =

Yorkton is a city in Saskatchewan, Canada.

Yorkton may also refer to:

- Yorkton (federal electoral district)
- Yorkton (provincial electoral district)
- Yorkton (territorial electoral district)
- Yorkton Municipal Airport, in Saskatchewan, Canada
- CFS Yorkton, a former radar installation
- Yorkton Creek, a river in Saskatchewan

== See also ==
- Yorktown (disambiguation)
