= Yora =

Yora may refer to:

- Yora people, or Amahuaca, an ethnic group of the Amazon
- Yora language, a language of the Amazon
- Yora languages, an Australian language group

== See also ==
- Eora, an Australian ethnic group
- Iora
- Jora (disambiguation)
- Yura (disambiguation)
