= U.S. Council of Muslim Organizations =

American Muslim advocacy group

- Formation: March 2014; 12 years ago
- Type: 501(c)(3) organization
- Tax ID no.: 46-2811888
- Website: uscmo.org

The U.S. Council of Muslim Organizations (USCMO) was founded in March 2014 as an umbrella organization to unify the approach, agenda and vision of the Muslim community.

== Formation ==
USCMO officially announced its formation on March 12, 2014 at an event at the National Press Club in Washington, DC. The organizations that participated in the launch include The Mosque Cares, Muslim American Society (MAS), American Muslims for Palestine (AMP), Council on American-Islamic Relations (CAIR), Islamic Circle of North America (ICNA), Muslim Legal Fund of America (MLFA), Muslim Alliance in North America (MANA), and Muslim Ummah of North America (MUNA).

== Leadership ==
USCMO is led by a board of directors.

== Positions ==
In public statements, USCMO has also called for increased transparency in the Freddie Gray investigations in Baltimore. Additionally, they called on republican presidential candidate, Jeb Bush, to drop an advisor of one of his PACs due to his long history of anti-Muslim activism. They also suggested that further investigation is required about claims that Turkey carried out the 1915 Armenian Genocide.

USCMO has condemned acts of violence worldwide including the November 2015 Paris attacks and Charlie Hebdo attacks, Chattanooga killings, Chapel Hill murders, murder of James Foley, and Boko Haram's Chibok schoolgirls kidnapping.

USCMO released a statement on its website that read “The US Council of Muslim Organizations, on behalf of our member institutions and American Muslims, stands in complete solidarity against antisemitism with the Jewish community and condemns the evil, unjust, and unjustifiable hostage-taking of members of the Congregation Beth Israel synagogue in Colleyville, Texas in the midst of their worship.”
