= Young Muslims (Islamic Circle of North America) =

American Muslim youth organization

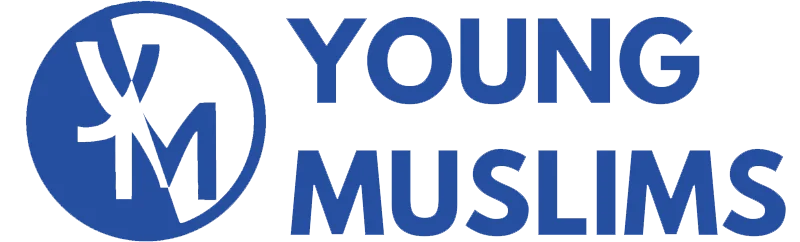
- Abbreviation: YM
- Formation: 1995
- Type: Muslim American grassroots youth organization; 501(c)(3) organization
- Tax ID no.: 05-0552240
- Headquarters: 166-26 89th Avenue, Queens, New York, United States
- Region served: United States (NY, NJ, PA, MA, MD, VA, KY, IL, GA, FL, TX, WA, and others)
- Members: 200+ NeighborNets (chapters)
- Official language: English
- Key people: Aqil Farooqui (National Coordinator); Shaheer Iqbal (Secretary General)
- Parent organization: Islamic Circle of North America (ICNA)
- Affiliations: U.S. Council of Muslim Organizations (USCMO)
- Website: Young Muslims

Young Muslims (YM) is a Muslim American grassroots youth 501(c)(3) organization and movement. It is the youth-wing of the Islamic Circle of North America, however, support and coordination are largely provided at the national level rather than locally, mainly through financing and larger public-facing events.

The organization states that its vision is to see American Muslim youth contribute to the betterment of society while maintaining a strong religious identity. YM describes its mission as supporting Muslim youth through companionship, mentorship, education, and community service.

YM operates a network of more than 200 local chapters, known as “NeighborNets,” which function as neighborhood-based groups that facilitate weekly activities, food outings, and discussions (halaqas), with the aim of fostering an emotional connection to Islam among average American Muslim youth. It has two parallel wings, YM Brothers and YM Sisters, which coordinate at the state and national levels but generally function independently at the local level.

== History ==
Young Muslims was established in 1995 through the unification of existing Muslim youth groups in New Jersey, New York City, and Chicago. It was formed as the youth division of the Islamic Circle of North America (ICNA) and developed into a nationwide youth organization within ICNA’s broader institutional network.

Over time, the organization expanded its chapter model through neighborhood-based units known as “NeighborNets” and broadened its activities to include recurring local and regional gatherings, retreats, and community service and civic engagement initiatives.

== Organizational structure ==
Although the leadership of Young Muslims Brothers and Young Muslims Sisters is separate, their organizational structures are generally parallel. Young Muslims describes its national leadership body as the National Shura, consisting of a National Coordinator (functioning as the president), a Secretary General (vice president), and shura members representing areas where the organization operates; the National Shura is elected every two years. At the local level, YM’s grassroots unit is organized through “NeighborNets,” each led by a NeighborNet Coordinator elected by peers and supported by a core team. NeighborNets that are able to sustain collective efforts in their local area are typically grouped into subregions (for example, New York East, New York West, Chicago, and Houston), each led by a Sub-Regional Coordinator and a supporting team. At the national level, YM also describes a cabinet-style structure composed of departments and national teams.

== Programs ==
The basic unit of Young Muslims’ programming is its local chapters, known as NeighborNets. NeighborNets function as a friend-group model that emphasizes building personal relationships, rather than relying primarily on social media or flyers, to bring Muslim youth to enjoyable activities and gradually develop their relationship with Islam. NeighborNets focus on building brotherhood and sisterhood by creating an experience that encourages participants to return regularly to the mosque. A typical NeighborNet gathering includes a discussion (halaqa), an activity, and a food outing. The goal is for youth to develop personal relationships that can later be leveraged to contribute to larger, more consistent projects that benefit society.

=== Study circle ===
While the halaqah component of a NeighborNet is an important part of individual development, members who become more involved in the organization are generally expected to join a study circle, either with a murabbi or in a peer-led format. The goal is to pair the work being done with knowledge rooted in YM principles and priorities. This study format typically emphasizes Islamic movement literature, such as the works of Abul A‘la Maududi, Sayyid Qutb, Hasan al-Banna, and Imam Jamil al-Amin, rather than classical Islamic sciences such as fiqh or aqidah, which require more specialized instruction and typically more formally trained teachers. The intent is to develop a worldview that members can apply toward contributing positively to society.

=== Retreats ===
Young Muslims organizes retreats at sub-regional and regional levels as part of its broader programming, describing them as weekend or seasonal gatherings that combine educational sessions and group discussions with recreational and social activities, such as outdoor programs and shared meals, in a religiously oriented environment. The organization reports hosting multiple retreats each year, with an average attendance of roughly 150 to 200 participants per retreat.

=== Conferences ===
Young Muslims organizes the Young Muslims Conference (YMC), described as a national youth conference that runs in parallel to the annual Islamic Circle of North America (ICNA) convention, featuring speakers, workshops, and programming focused on community-building and Islamic work. The organization has described YMC as bringing “thousands” of youth together in 2023. In addition to YMC, YM has hosted smaller regional youth conferences across the United States, with an emphasis on keeping attendance fees affordable and partnering with other youth organizations, including MSA, MIST, and MAS Youth. Past speakers have included Yasir Qadhi, Omar Suleiman, Nouman Ali Khan, Sami Hamdi, and others.

=== Societal impact ===
YM engages in a number of societal-impact initiatives, including civic engagement and relief-oriented work carried out through partnerships and coalitions. The organization describes increased national civic engagement efforts in the wake of October 7, including participation in American Muslims for Palestine (AMP) advocacy training and Capitol Hill meetings, hosting webinars with AMP and CAIR focused on safe advocacy, and mobilizing members for national Palestine-related marches in Washington, D.C.

Specifically, Young Muslims was listed among the organizations involved in the American Muslim Task Force for Palestine’s planning and mobilization for the January 13, 2024, March on Washington for Gaza in Washington, D.C., held in response to the war in Gaza and attended by an estimated tens of thousands to as many as 400,000 demonstrators from across the United States.

YM also describes humanitarian and relief engagement through partners such as ICNA Relief, as well as U.S.-based organizations with an international footprint, including Helping Hand for Relief and Development, which it says supports youth trips for relief activities in Jordan, and the Human Development Foundation’s “Gaza Week” initiative, which it describes as involving awareness, fundraising, and advocacy efforts.

== Affiliations ==
Young Muslims operates as the youth division of the Islamic Circle of North America (ICNA). The organization describes itself as part of ICNA’s broader institutional network, while also indicating that its youth programming is primarily led through its own local and national structures. Young Muslims Inc. is listed as a council member organization of the U.S. Council of Muslim Organizations (USCMO), a coalition of national Muslim American organizations.

== Notable alumni ==
- Danial Farrukh, Author of Anchored in Faith, Driven by Purpose and former National Coordinator of YM
- Faraz Iqbal, CTO of Edible Arrangements and former National Coordinator of YM
- Tayyab Yunus, Social philanthropist, National Development Director for CAIR, and former National Coordinator of YM
- Subhan Tariq, Distinguished federal consumer rights attorney and former member of YM National Shura
- Kaiser Aslam, Muslim chaplain at Rutgers University and former National Coordinator of YM
- Irfan Sarwar, Activist and CEO of GainPeace

== See also ==
- Islamic Circle of North America
- U.S. Council of Muslim Organizations
