= Yapp =

Yapp is an old English surname, derived from an Old English word meaning "crooked, bent; deceitful; shrewd, smart". Notable people with the surname include:

- Charlotte Seymour Yapp (1879–1934), British nurse
- Jake Yapp, British comedian, composer, and writer
- John Yapp (born 1983), Welsh international rugby union player
- Malcolm Yapp (1931–2025), British historian
- Richard Henry Yapp (1871–1929), English botanist
- Stan Yapp (1933–2012), first leader of West Midlands County Council
- William Brunsdon Yapp (1909–1990), zoologist
- Yapp Hung Fai (born 1990), Hong Kong footballer

There is also a type of binding known as "yapp"; this is a limp leather binding with the covers overlapping the edges of the book; it is named after a bookseller called Yapp.

== See also ==
- Ye (surname), spelled Yap or Yapp in Hakka and Minnan
- Yap, an island in the Pacific Ocean in the Federated States of Micronesia
- Yappie
- Yapp (mobile application)
