= Ox Eckhardt =

American football and baseball player (1901–1951)

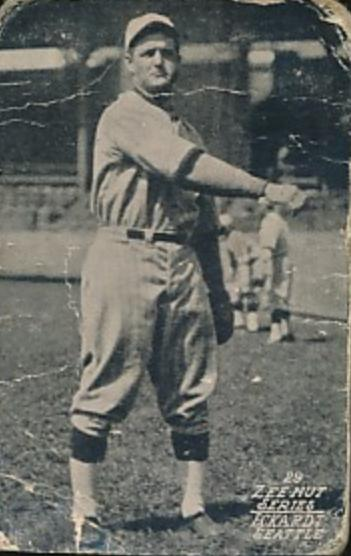
- Eckhardt in 1929
- Born: Oscar George Eckhardt; December 23, 1901; Yorktown, Texas, U.S.
- Died: April 22, 1951 (aged 49); Yorktown, Texas, U.S.
- Football career

No. 0
- Position: Fullback

Personal information
- Listed height: 6 ft 1 in (1.85 m)
- Listed weight: 190 lb (86 kg)

Career information
- High school: Stephen F. Austin (Austin, Texas)
- College: Texas

Career history
- New York Giants (1926)

Career statistics
- Rushing touchdowns: 2
- Stats at Pro Football Reference
- Baseball career
- Right fielder
- Batted: Left Threw: Right

MLB debut
- April 16, 1932, for the Boston Braves

Last MLB appearance
- May 15, 1936, for the Brooklyn Dodgers

MLB statistics
- Batting average: .192
- Home runs: 1
- RBI: 7
- Stats at Baseball Reference

Teams
- Boston Braves (1932); Brooklyn Dodgers (1936)

Oscar George "Ox" Eckhardt (December 23, 1901 – April 22, 1951) was an American professional baseball and football player. He was an outfielder for the Boston Braves and Brooklyn Dodgers of Major League Baseball, and a fullback for the New York Giants of the National Football League.

Eckhardt holds the known all-time professional baseball record for batting average, counting both major and minor league stats with .365.

(Ty Cobb holds the major league record, .366, but Cobb's minor league average of .304 lowers his total professional-ball average to .364, second behind Eckhardt. Ike Boone holds the minor league record, .370, but his major league average of .321 also lowers his total professional-ball average to .364 (just behind Cobb if their averages are expanded to further digits). Eckhardt hit .192 in the major leagues, but in just 52 at bats, so his known minor league average of .366 was lowered just one point.)

On May 28, 2024, Major League Baseball announced that it had integrated Negro League statistics into its records, giving Josh Gibson the highest professional career batting average, his major league average being .373 (according to Baseball Reference) and his average outside the major leagues being .374. However, a good portion of Gibson's statistical record is missing.

== Football career ==
Eckhardt played college football as a halfback and quarterback for the Texas Longhorns. He intercepted a pass in the Longhorns 16–0 upset win over Vanderbilt in 1923.

In 1926, he played professionally as a fullback in 11 games for the New York Giants of the National Football League (NFL).

== Baseball career ==
In spite of his outstanding ability to hit for average, Eckhardt – a poor fielder who lacked much home run power – was never able to establish himself in the major leagues. He spent a few years as a football coach and assistant professor at West Texas State Teachers College (now West Texas A&M University), so he was already 26 when he started seriously playing minor league ball, which is older than the average age of major league debuts. He was invited to spring training by the Detroit Tigers in 1929, 1930, and 1931, but he didn't make the team. He played in spring training for the Boston Braves 1932, and did go north with the Braves, but was sent back to the minors after eight at bats as a pinch hitter. The next year, 1933, he hit .414 for the San Francisco Missions, which is the PCL (Pacific Coast League) record. In 1935, he again won the PCL batting title, edging out 20-year-old Joe DiMaggio, .399 to .398.

This finally earned him a slot on a major league club, the 1936 Brooklyn Dodgers, with a chance to win a job as a regular. But Eckhardt was 36 years old by then, was still a poor fielder with little power, and in ten starts hit just .182 in 44 at bats. He was sent back to the minors, never to return.

Eckhardt was inducted into the Pacific Coast League Hall of Fame in 2003.

== Head coaching record ==
Year	Team	Overall	Conference	Standing	Bowl/playoffs
West Texas State Buffaloes (Texas Intercollegiate Athletic Association) (1925–1927)
1925	West Texas State	4–4	1–3	T–10th	
1926	West Texas State	2–6	0–4	9th	
1927	West Texas State	6–3–1	2–2	T–5th	
West Texas State:		12–13–1	3–9		
Total:		12–13–1			

== Notes ==
1. Early baseball minor league records are incomplete and most of the missing data is lost to history, so whether Eckhardt would still hold the record if data was complete can never be known with certainty, but is probable since most relevant records are known. The cutoff for consideration is (arbitrarily) set at 1,000 at bats.
