= Yorktown Independent School District =

School district in Texas, United States

Address
- 331 West Main Yorktown, Texas; United States

District information
- Schools: 3
- NCES District ID: 4846650

Students and staff
- Students: 541
- Teachers: 53.32 (on an FTE basis)
- Student–teacher ratio: 10.15:1

Other information
- Website: www.yisd.org

Yorktown Independent School District is a public school district based in Yorktown, Texas (USA).

In 2009, the school district was rated "academically acceptable" by the Texas Education Agency.

== Schools ==
- Yorktown High School (grades 9–12)
- Yorktown Junior High School (grades 6–8)
- Yorktown Elementary School (grades PK-5)
  - 2006 National Blue Ribbon School.
