= Yore =

Yore is a word referring to a long time ago. It may refer to

- Yöre, Kuyucak, a village in Turkey
- Yore!, a comic strip in The Dandy
- River Yore, a historic name of the River Ure in Yorkshire, England

== See also ==
- You're
- Ore
- Yora (disambiguation)
