= Yor =

Yor may refer to:

- Chai yor – Type of dim sum
- Marc Yor (1949–2014), French mathematician
- Moo yor – Vietnamese sausage
- Val-Yor
- Yor Anei (born 1999), American basketball player
- Yor Forger, a fictional character of Spy × Family
- Yor the Hunter (Henga el cazador), a comics character created by Ray Collins and Juan Zanotto
  - Yor, the main character in the 1983 film Yor, the Hunter from the Future, based on the comics character
- yor, ISO 639-2 and ISO 639-3 code for the Yoruba language
- Yor-yor (film)

== See also ==
- Yore
- Your
