= YAC =

YAC may refer to:

- Yasser Arafat Cup, Palestinian football cup competition
- Yeast artificial chromosome
- Youth advisory council
- York Against Cancer
- Yards after catch, a statistic in American football
- The Yale Alley Cats, an all-male a cappella group
- The IATA code for Cat Lake Airport

== See also ==
- Yak (disambiguation)
