= YF =

YF may refer to:

- YF, US Navy hull classifification symbol for Covered barge, self propelled
- YF, US aircraft designator for Prototype Fighter
- YF, tail code for US Marine Corps helicopter squadron HMMH-462

== See also ==
- YFS (disambiguation)
