= YM =

YM, Ym, or ym may refer to:

== Arts and entertainment ==
- YM (magazine), an American teen magazine
- Yngwie J. Malmsteen, Swedish guitarist

== Businesses and organizations ==
- Dow Jones Industrial Average (futures symbol YM)
- Montenegro Airlines (IATA airport code YM)
- Yang Ming Marine Transport Corporation, a Taiwanese shipping company, that prefixes its ships' names with YM
- Yarmouth Mariners, a Maritime Junior A Hockey League team
- Yield management, a variable pricing strategy based on understanding consumer behavior in order to maximize profits
- Young Marines, an American youth organization that promotes a drug-free lifestyle
- Young Muslims (disambiguation), one of several Muslim youth organizations
- Youth Meeting, a program of CISV International

== Science and technology ==
- .ym, the Atari ST/Amstrad CPC YM2149 sound chip format
- YM (selective medium), a selective growth medium which is a combination of yeast and mold
- Yoctomolar (yM), a unit of molar concentration
- Yoctometre (ym), a unit of length or distance
- Yottametre (Ym), a unit of length or distance

== Other uses ==
- Yam (god), Ugaritic deity of the sea
- Dredge, self propelled (YM), a US Navy hull classification symbol
- "Ynnä muuta", a Finnish phrase meaning roughly "and the others" or "etc."
