= Inverse search =

Inverse search (also called "reverse search") is a feature of some non-interactive typesetting programs, such as LaTeX and GNU LilyPond. These programs read an abstract, textual, definition of a document as input, and convert this into a graphical format such as DVI or PDF. In a windowing system, this typically means that the source code is entered in one editor window, and the resulting output is viewed in a different output window. Inverse search means that a graphical object in the output window works as a hyperlink, which brings you back to the line and column in the editor, where the clicked object was defined. The inverse search feature is particularly useful during proofreading.

== Implementations ==
- In TeX and LaTeX, the package srcltx provides an inverse search feature through DVI output files (e.g., with yap or Xdvi), while vpe, pdfsync and SyncTeX provide similar functionality for PDF output, among other techniques. The Comparison of TeX editors has a column on support of inverse search; most of them provide it nowadays.
- GNU LilyPond provides an inverse search feature through PDF output files, since version 2.6. The program calls this feature Point-and-click,
- Many integrated development environments for programming use inverse search to display compilation error messages, and during debugging when a breakpoint is hit.

== Bibliography ==
- Jérôme Laurens, ”Direct and reverse synchronization with SyncTeX”, in TUGboat 29(3), 2008, p365–371, PDF (532KB) — including an overview of synchronization techniques with TeX
