= Yapp (mobile application) =

- Developer: Yapp Inc
- Release: November 2012
- Operating system: iOS, Android
- Type: application framework
- Website: www.yapp.us

Yapp is a self-service online platform that allows users to create mobile event applications with no coding knowledge. The product was launched out of beta by its founders Maria Seidman and Luke Melia in 2012.

== History ==
Yapp was founded in 2011 when co-founder Maria Seidman first attempted to look for software and tools for non-technical people to create affordable mobile apps. She realized there was not an easy way for non-technical people to create an affordable mobile app with ease. Seidman was formerly the Vice President of Digital Distribution at Warner Bros. She found partner Luke Melia through the New York CTO Club, later he wrote the first line of code for Yapp in June 2011.

In 2012, Melia and Seidman presented a working prototype of Yapp at the New York Tech Meetup. Yapp opened in private beta in March 2012 and to the public in November 2012.

The company gained early success with clients including Verizon Wireless and WorldVentures to organize training and employee events regionally for their network bootcamps and events. Later in the year it added few more clients to including EdCamp, Duke University, BlogHer, Westfield High School, X Prize Foundation, the Innovation Partnership Program, and others. Yapp is based in New York City and is part of the Silicon Alley tech boom. The company launched with an undisclosed amount of seed funding from Kleiner Perkins, North Bridge Venture Partners, Cue Ball and other individual investors.

While originally launched as a free service, in November 2014, Yapp introduced paid service tiers called Yapp Plus. In 2014, Seidman was named Entrepreneur Magazine's Emerging Entrepreneur of the Year for her work on Yapp.

== Products ==
Yapp has two major products Yapp Online Editor, a template-based editor on the web and Yapp app, hosted on users' mobile devices through the mobile app Yapp. When apps are published, they are attached to a link that can be used to download the app on a mobile device. The apps are not published to the iTunes or Google Play app stores directly and are downloaded using a shortlink generated from the online editor. Yapp's online editor and mobile app are built using Ember.js, an open-source JavaScript application framework.

== Business model ==
Yapp runs a freemium model and creates white-label products for companies and organizations based on the Yapp mobile app. The apps are custom designed and maintained in the Apple and Google Play app stores by Yapp.
