= YV =

YV or yv may refer to:

People:

- Y. V. Chandrachud (1920 – 2008), Chief Justice of India from 1978 to 1985
- Y. V. Knorosov (1922 — 1999), Russian linguist, epigrapher and ethnographer
- Y. V. Reddy (born 1941), Governor of the Reserve Bank of India (RBI) from 2003 to 2008

Other uses:

- Yuva Vahini (a regularly used shorter name for the Hindu Yuva Vahini), an Indian Hindutva youth militia
- Mesa Airlines (IATA code YV)
- A US Navy hull classification symbol: Drone aircraft catapult control craft (YV)
- Venezuela (ITU prefix YV, used in amateur radio call signs and aircraft registration numbers)
