= Yorktown, Texas =

- City
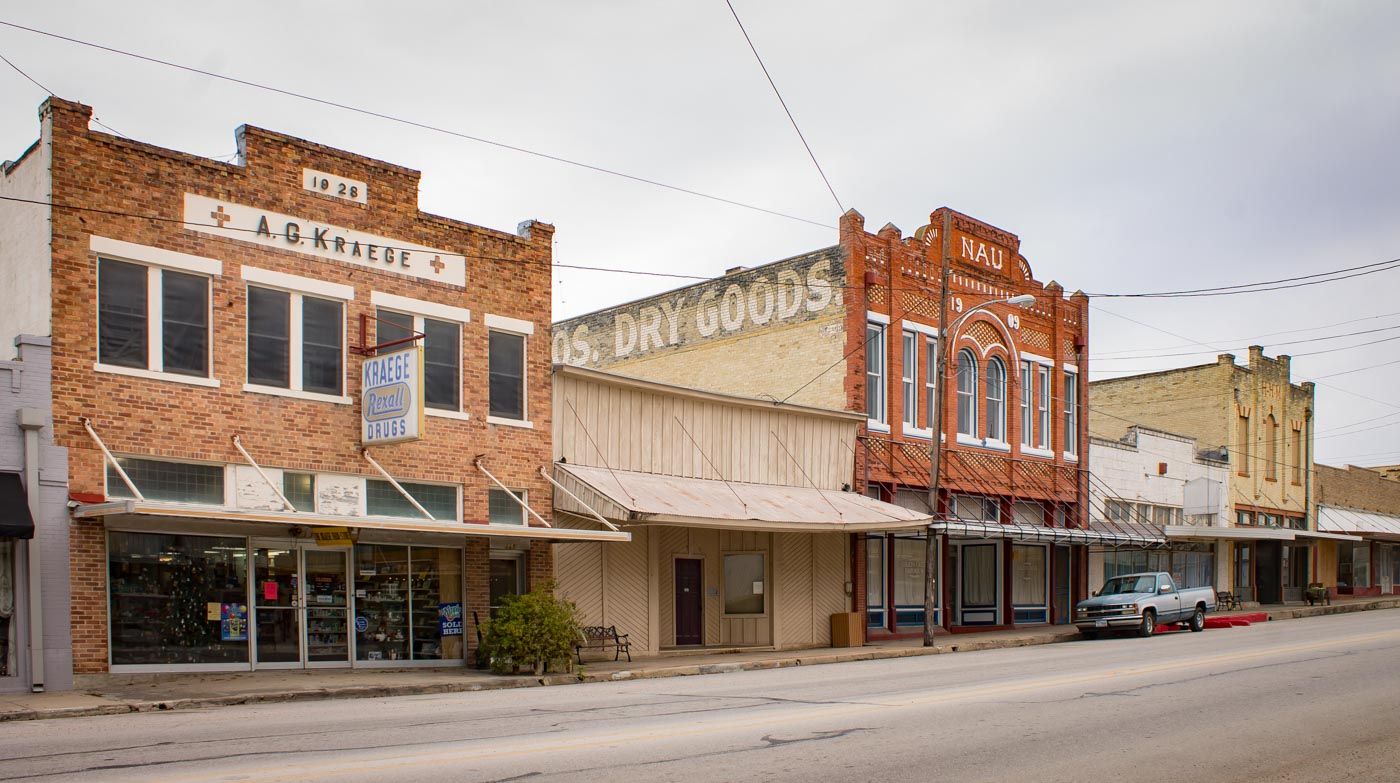
- Downtown Yorktown

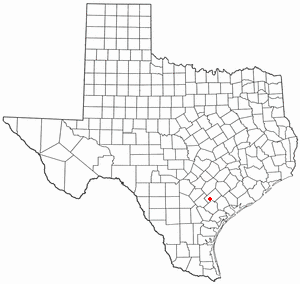
- Location of Yorktown, Texas

- Coordinates: 28°59′00″N 97°30′09″W
- Country: United States
- State: Texas
- County: DeWitt

Area
  - Total: 1.73 sq mi (4.47 km^{2})
  - Land: 1.73 sq mi (4.47 km^{2})
  - Water: 0 sq mi (0.00 km^{2})
- Elevation: 276 ft (84 m)

Population (2020)
  - Total: 1,810
  - Density: 1,186.5/sq mi (458.11/km^{2})
- Time zone: UTC-6 (Central (CST))
  - Summer (DST): UTC-5 (CDT)
- ZIP code: 78164
- Area code: 361
- FIPS code: 48-80584
- GNIS feature ID: 1377672
- Website: www.yorktowntx.com

Yorktown is a city in DeWitt County, Texas, United States. The population was 1,810 at the 2020 census.

== Geography ==
Yorktown is located in southwestern DeWitt County at 28°59′00″N 97°30′09″W (28.983196, –97.502415). State Highways 72 and 119 intersect on the western side of town. Highway 72 leads northeast 16 miles (26 km) to Cuero and southwest 25 miles (40 km) to Kenedy, while Highway 119 leads northwest 35 miles (56 km) to Stockdale and south 24 miles (39 km) to Goliad.

According to the United States Census Bureau, Yorktown has a total area of 1.7 square miles (4.5 km^{2}), all land.

=== Climate ===
The climate in this area is characterized by hot, humid summers and generally mild to cool winters. According to the Köppen Climate Classification system, Yorktown has a humid subtropical climate, abbreviated "Cfa" on climate maps.

== Demographics ==
Historical population
Census	Pop.	Note	%±
1880	430		—
1890	522		21.4%
1900	846		62.1%
1910	1,180		39.5%
1920	1,723		46.0%
1930	1,882		9.2%
1940	2,081		10.6%
1950	2,596		24.7%
1960	2,527		−2.7%
1970	2,411		−4.6%
1980	2,498		3.6%
1990	2,207		−11.6%
2000	2,271		2.9%
2010	2,092		−7.9%
2020	1,810		−13.5%
U.S. Decennial Census

=== 2020 census ===
As of the 2020 census, Yorktown had a population of 1,810. The median age was 42.4 years. 23.8% of residents were under the age of 18 and 24.3% of residents were 65 years of age or older. For every 100 females there were 88.7 males, and for every 100 females age 18 and over there were 84.5 males age 18 and over.

0.0% of residents lived in urban areas, while 100.0% lived in rural areas.

There were 743 households in Yorktown, of which 29.5% had children under the age of 18 living in them. Of all households, 40.1% were married-couple households, 21.7% were households with a male householder and no spouse or partner present, and 32.0% were households with a female householder and no spouse or partner present. About 35.9% of all households were made up of individuals and 19.2% had someone living alone who was 65 years of age or older.

There were 969 housing units, of which 23.3% were vacant. The homeowner vacancy rate was 2.9% and the rental vacancy rate was 18.3%.

Racial composition as of the 2020 census
Race	Number	Percent
White	1,223	67.6%
Black or African American	73	4.0%
American Indian and Alaska Native	14	0.8%
Asian	2	0.1%
Native Hawaiian and Other Pacific Islander	1	0.1%
Some other race	145	8.0%
Two or more races	352	19.4%
Hispanic or Latino (of any race)	878	48.5%

=== 2000 census ===
As of the census of 2000, there were 2,271 people, 864 households, and 584 families residing in the city. The population density was 1,318.1 inhabitants per square mile (508.9/km^{2}). There were 1,048 housing units at an average density of 608.3 per square mile (234.9/km^{2}). The racial makeup of the city was 79.83% White, 2.99% African American, 0.40% Native American, 15.32% from other races, and 1.45% from two or more races. Hispanic or Latino of any race were 37.60% of the population.

There were 864 households, out of which 30.7% had children under the age of 18 living with them, 50.7% were married couples living together, 12.5% had a female householder with no husband present, and 32.3% were non-families. 29.9% of all households were made up of individuals, and 18.9% had someone living alone who was 65 years of age or older. The average household size was 2.54 and the average family size was 3.15.

In the city, the population was spread out, with 26.3% under the age of 18, 7.8% from 18 to 24, 22.7% from 25 to 44, 20.7% from 45 to 64, and 22.5% who were 65 years of age or older. The median age was 40 years. For every 100 females, there were 85.7 males. For every 100 females age 18 and over, there were 81.6 males.

The median income for a household in the city was $25,507, and the median income for a family was $28,529. Males had a median income of $25,234 versus $17,031 for females. The per capita income for the city was $12,041. About 18.4% of families and 23.1% of the population were below the poverty line, including 31.5% of those under age 18 and 16.2% of those age 65 or over.

=== Lithuanian heritage ===
Yorktown, located in Texas, holds the distinction of being the site of the oldest known Lithuanian-American community in the United States. Although most current Texans of Lithuanian descent are not directly connected to this community, its history remains significant. The first Lithuanians arrived in Texas in 1852, shortly after the Mexican-American War. These early settlers hailed from Lithuania Minor, a region under German control at the time, rather than from the part of Lithuania controlled by the Russian Empire, where serfdom and restricted emigration still prevailed. Upon arrival, the Lithuanians integrated into the German-American communities, as their culture bore similarities to that of the Germans.

The most prominent symbol of Yorktown's Lithuanian roots is the Smith Creek Lithuanian Cemetery. In the late 20th century, descendants of the Yorktown Lithuanians restored the cemetery. They erected a sign indicating it as a Lithuanian cemetery and painted the Lithuanian flag. Approximately 30 tombstones remain, although more individuals might have been buried there.

Several descendants of the first Lithuanian Texans funded a memorial plaque in Yorktown. The plaque, written in English, states: "Lithuanians in Texas. Among the many European immigrants arriving in Texas in the mid-19th century was a small group of Lithuanians who settled in the Yorktown vicinity of De Witt County. Due to their eventual assimilation with the numerous German immigrants in the area, the Lithuanians and their contributions to the history of this region were overlooked for generations. Records reveal that the first Lithuanian family to settle in this area probably was that of David and Dora (Scholze) Stanchos. They arrived about 1852, making them among the earliest documented Lithuanian immigrants to America. By 1874 they were joined by about 70 more immigrants, most from the province of Gumbinnen in what was then part of East Prussia. Leaving their homeland for a variety of religious and political reasons, the Lithuanians arrived in Texas primarily through the ports of Galveston and Indianola. Establishing farms in the area, the Lithuanians became American citizens and contributed to the history and culture of this area. Men from the community fought on both sides of the American Civil War. A small graveyard south of Yorktown known as Jonischkies Cemetery contains the interments of many of these early settlers."This plaque is one of the few Lithuanian-related memorial plaques in the United States.

Yorktown's history museum features numerous exhibits related to Lithuanian culture and the first Lithuanians in Yorktown. These include copies of letters written in Lithuanian, 19th-century Lithuanian work tools, a fishing net, and cattle branding irons.

The first Lithuanians in Yorktown were Lutherans. Together with local Germans, they contributed to the construction of St. Paul Lutheran Church. The first church was built in 1874, and it was completely rebuilt in 1930. Some of the stained-glass windows feature Lithuanian family names, such as the Joniškis family.

The unique history and longevity of Yorktown's Lithuanian community have attracted various researchers from both the United States and Lithuania. A documentary film and several books have been produced about this community, highlighting its cultural significance and historical contributions.

== History ==
The city was founded by Captain John York and Charles Eckhardt and named in honor of Captain John York, a famous Indian fighter and was in command of a company of citizens who, under Ben Milam, defeated General Cos in 1835 at the Siege of Béxar. For his military services, York received many acres of land in the Coleto Creek area.

Charles Eckhardt started a mercantile business in Indianola, which at that time was a major Texas seaport. Eckhardt participated in the Texas Revolution and may have met Captain York during military service. Eckhardt contracted with John A. King, one of the pioneers of West Texas, to survey a road from Indianola through Yorktown to New Braunfels, later known as the Old Indianola Trail. From its inception in February, 1848, this road remained the chief thoroughfare for this part of the state to New Braunfels and San Antonio. This trail shortened the former route by twenty miles and established Yorktown as an important relay station for freighters, prairie schooners, trail drivers, and stagecoaches bringing mail and passengers. They came through upper town on North Riedel Street.

Early in 1848, after the founders had the proposed town surveyed, they offered 10 acres (40,000 m^{2}) and the choice of a lot free to the first ten families to settle the townsite. Many German, Bohemian, Lithuanian and Polish families came and soon changed this wilderness into one of the most prosperous sections of the entire state.

In May 1848, Peter Metz and John Frank built the first house in the settlement of Yorktown, for Charles Eckhardt. It was built of logs, twelve by twenty feet, with a back room and chimney. This house was later occupied by a brother, Caesar Eckhardt, who was the founder of C. Eckhardt and Sons Mercantile Company, known for half a century as the leading firm of its kind in western DeWitt County.

Unfortunately, neither of the founders lived to see the town develop beyond this point. In October 1848, in a battle with Marauding Indians, Captain York and his son-in-law, James Madison Bell, were killed. They were buried in a single hand-made coffin in the Yorktown Cemetery some seven miles (11 km) east of Yorktown; a historical marker designates York's grave. In 1852, on an inspection of some of his properties in Central America, Eckhardt contracted yellow fever and died at sea on his return trip. He is buried in New Orleans. The Eckhardts did not have any children, while the Yorks had ten children.

The Catholics established a church in 1867 and the Lutherans followed in 1872. The huge oak tree on the lawn of the latter church is one of the oldest in the state. The town was incorporated in 1871.

== Western Days ==
Celebrated on the third weekend of October, Western Days is a three-day town celebration featuring a carnival, barbecue cook-off, horseshoes and washers tournaments, quilt show, poker run, and street dancing. Western Days is held downtown at the city park. Numerous food booths and art and craft stands line the streets. Saturday morning begins with a large parade through town. Western days is one of the few festivals in the area that charges no admission to the park or dance.

Officially started in 1958, Western Days has its roots dating from the early to mid 1950s with Leslie and Cecil Mueller's M&M Rodeo Company organizing cowboy parades to promote the rodeo performances on Smith Creek, just south of Yorktown. A showman and promoter, Leslie Mueller gathered the rodeo cowboys to ride horseback through downtown Yorktown. These processions were said to have been quite a wild sight. Since there were not enough broke saddle horses to go around, many of the cowboys paraded down Main on broncs right out of the bucking horse string.

In the spring of 1958 Mueller, in cooperation with the Yorktown Chamber of Commerce, planned a Western parade to involve the entire community, as well as out-of-town organizations. A two-day rodeo was planned as well. Mueller pledged a pair of handmade boots to the parade's best-dressed cowgirl, while the Chamber promised boots to the best-dressed cowboy. Other prizes were pledged from community businesses such as Daniel Dry Gods, Simecek's Firestone, J. E. Wolf Sr. and Cole Dry goods.

The April 2, 1958, edition of The Yorktown News reported that the parade was "conceived on the spur of the moment, with no time make elaborate plans, appoint committees or work out details…." The newspaper further reported that the success of the venture was due "…to the spontaneous and whole-hearted cooperation of local business men…" In spite of this last-minute planning, on Saturday, March 29 at 3 p.m. Yorktown welcomed a crowd that jammed the downtown sidewalks to see the parade led by the VFW Color Guard. The "Bronc Busters" (the Yorktown High School marching band), led by Mary Gail Kerlick, followed close behind. The parade featured the famous Lone Star Brewing Company Shetland Pony Hitch. This team of matched Shetlands was outfitted with ten gallon hats and six shooters and pulled a miniature covered wagon. A parade highlight was Monroe Woods' mustang team pulling a frontier wagon carrying an ancient two-seater Chick Sale (outhouse), complete with corn cobs and a Sears catalog. The parade also included colorfully-garbed mounted groups, several floats, new tractors, trucks and automobiles, as well as the four-piece Disintegrated Brotherhood of Near Musicians. With a broom and shovel, Sparky, the rodeo clown, brought up the rear and proclaimed that Yorktown was not a one-horse town indeed.

The Yorktown News also reported that most of the western parade watchers "…hightailed it out to Les Mueller's Smith Creek Arena…to take in the rodeo....We saw cars bumper to bumper all the way over the hill and as they wended their way into the grounds more and more kept coming....The show got underway about nine o'clock, and a thriller it was…with mean, ornery broncs and bulls, and fast elusive calves, there were plenty of spills, thrills and chills…as good a show as we've seen anywhere." Rodeo events included calf roping, bareback bronc riding, bull riding, bull dogging, saddle bronc riding and the ladies' barrel race. The performance also featured Tab Evans and his trained hog, Pork Chop and his trained dog, Wheeler.

After the success of the first parade and rodeo, the Yorktown Chamber of Commerce continued the celebration annually. In 1962 the Chamber sponsored the first Western Days royal court with Jo Ann Boone crowned as queen. For nearly two decades, M&M Rodeo Company produced a rodeo in conjunction with the Western Days celebration. Throughout the years, the rodeos featured celebrated cowboys such as Bud Humphrey, Glen Dorn, Pat Doyle, Glenn McQueen, Billy Bridges, Cotton Proctor, Sonny Berry and Phil Lyne. Working ranch cowboys from the area who rode as pick-up men included Carl Hoefling, John Horny and Lester Davis. Raymond Stoebner of Victoria served as rodeo announcer while renowned rodeo bull fighters Darrel "Sparky" Sparkman and Billy Willis entertained the crowd with clown antics while protecting the bull riders. Willis died in Waco at age 68. Mueller constructed a new arena on his ranch north of Yorktown on Highway 240 in the small community once known as Little St. Louis and the rodeos were moved from the Smith Creek arena.

In July 1963 Mueller died after a horseback riding accident during a rodeo in Cuero. However, the Western Days rodeos continued with Mueller's widow, Cecil Olivia Gilliam Mueller and son Don, managing M&M Rodeo Company. The last rodeo they produced in Yorktown was in 1975.

Today, Western Days continues to draw parade participants from surrounding counties, as well as visitors from across the country. The thousands who come to Yorktown each year attend not only the Grand Parade, but also experience live music and entertainment, chili cook-offs, various contests, and shopping. The celebration remains a reflection of the community traditions that began in 1958.

== Education ==
Yorktown is served by the Yorktown Independent School District and is home to the Yorktown Wildcats.

== Photo Gallery ==
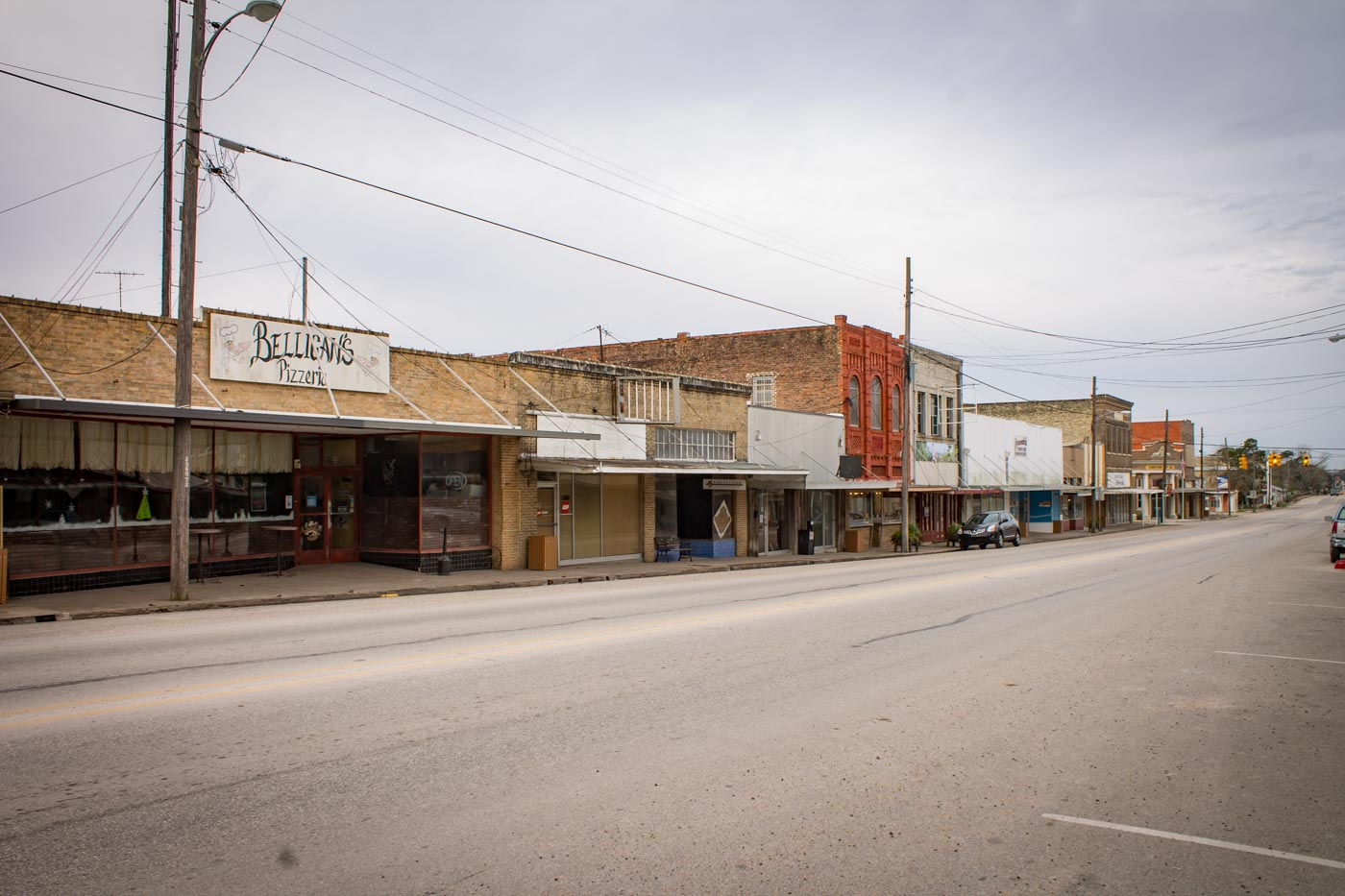

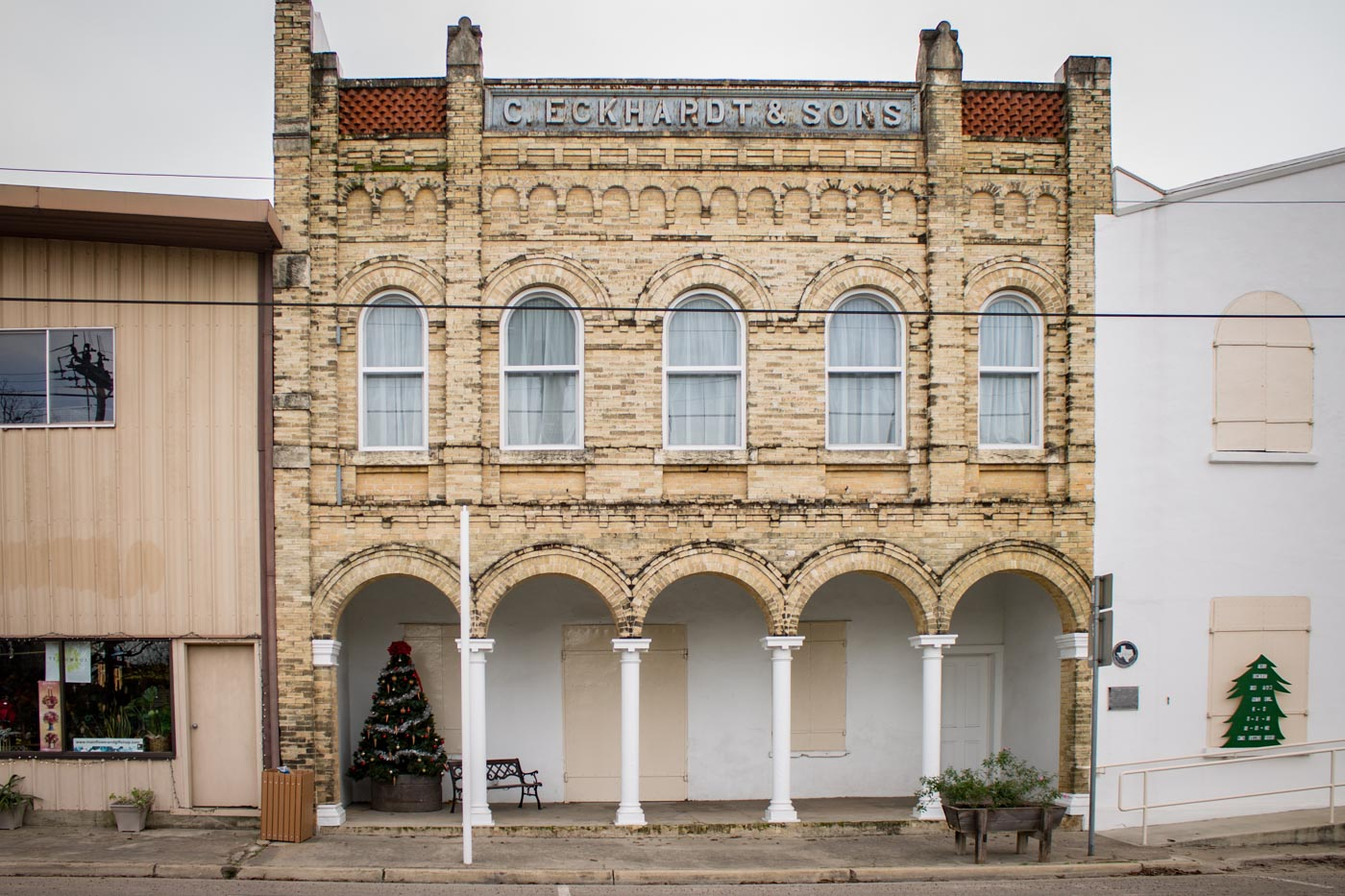

== Notable people ==
- Harlon Block, one of the marines pictured in Raising the Flag on Iwo Jima
- Ox Eckhardt, Major League Baseball player
