= Guy Dodson =

British crystallographer (1937–2012)

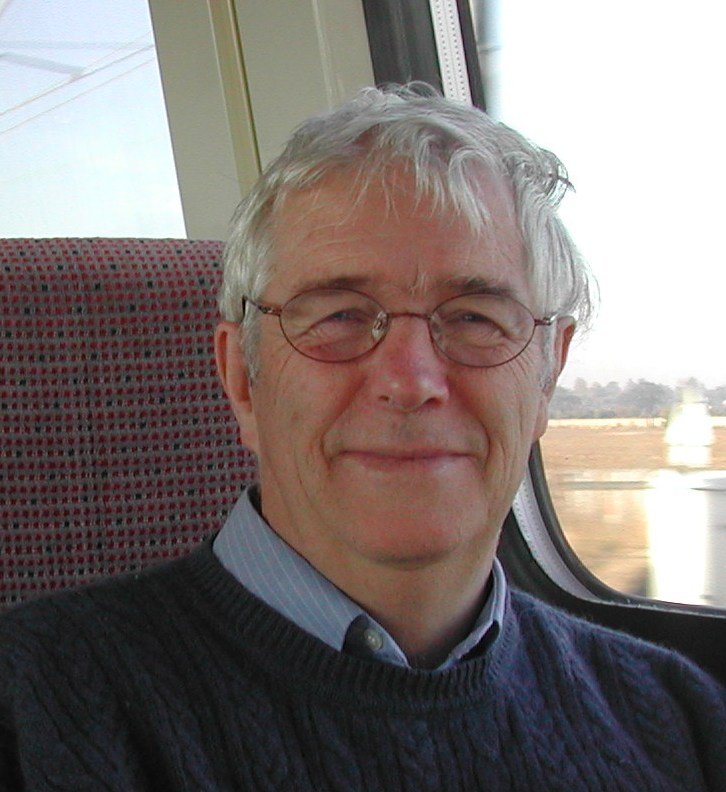
- Born: George Guy Dodson; 13 January 1937; Palmerston North, New Zealand
- Died: 24 December 2012 (aged 75); York, England
- Education: University of New Zealand (BSc, PhD)
- Spouse: Eleanor Dodson
- Children: 4
- Awards: FRS; FMedSci; ForMemINSA
- Scientific career
- Fields: X-ray crystallography
- Workplaces: University of York; University of Oxford; National Institute for Medical Research
- Website: ysbl.york.ac.uk/guymemories; www.york.ac.uk/chemistry/research/ysbl/aboutus/guy_dodson

George Guy Dodson (13 January 1937 – 24 December 2012), was a British biochemist who specialised in protein crystallography at the University of York.

== Education ==
Dodson graduated from the University of New Zealand where he was awarded a Bachelor of Science and Doctor of Philosophy degrees. His doctoral thesis, completed in 1961, was titled An X-ray analysis of an alkaloid and some investigation into nickel bis-salicylaldahyde triethylene tetramine.

== Career ==
Dodson did postdoctoral research with Dorothy Hodgkin at the University of Oxford. He devised along with Hodgkin, very intricate experimental, crystallographic and computer techniques that led to the final solution of the structure of insulin. Dodson was head of the structural biology laboratories at the University of York and National Institute for Medical Research, London. During his career he collaborated with many scientists including Dale Wigley, Gideon Davies, Andrzej Brzozowski, Leo Brady and Max Perutz.

== Awards and honours ==
Dodson was elected a Fellow of the Royal Society (FRS) in 1994. His nomination reads

Guy Dodson's major researches have been concerned with the Xray analysis of a variety of crystalline proteins many now being carried out with increasing speed and accuracy through the use of synchrotron radiation. His most considerable work, on insulin, extends from his part in the first solution of the 2 zinc insulin crystal structure to the refinement of the atomic parameters of both protein and water moledules at 1.5A resolution. He has recently explored remarkable conformational variations of the insulin molecule under different conditions, which give rise to three different hexamers, dimers at different pH and a monomeric despentapeptide insulin. He is at present investigating structure activity relations of genetically engineered varieties of insulin. Other systems he has studied include a series of bacterial ribonucleases and the T state of haemoglobin as seen in the partially liganded T alpha oxy beta deoxy, T alpha met beta met and T alpha deoxy beta deoxy human haemoglobins, crystallised from polyethyleneglycol. It is characteristic of him that he has created a laboratory to which protein crystals are brought from all over the world and their structures solved.

Dodson was also a Foreign Member of the Indian National Science Academy (ForMemINSA) and the Academy of Medical Sciences (FMedSci).

He was a recipient of the RSC Structural Chemistry Award in 1991.

== Personal life ==
Dodson was married to the scientist Eleanor Dodson with whom he had four children.
