= Yale Postdoctoral Association =

The Yale Postdoctoral Association (YPA) is an association composed of postdocs from all disciplines working at the Yale University. The goal of this association is to create a sense of community among postdocs, as well as to improve their experience at Yale. It organizes professional development and social events around Yale. There is an average of 1200 postdocs working at Yale, with contract length ranging from 1 to 5 years.

The YPA was created in March 2015. On June 8, 2018, the YPA organized the 1st Postdoc Symposium at Yale, a unique opportunity for postdoc to mingle, network and present their research.

== Organization & membership ==
The association is supervised by two elected chairs helped by two secretaries. The association is organized in committees lead each by two coordinators. The committees are:

- Professional Development
- Community & Networking
- Advocacy
- Mentorship
- Treasury
- Communication

Belonging Committee

The YPA consider that every postdoc at Yale (postdoctoral associate and postdoctoral fellow) is a member of YPA and can participate in the events. The YPA executive board is composed of volunteering postdocs that want to improve the community.

== Events ==
- Monthly Happy Hours
- Career Cafés, roundtable.
- Orientation "201" to the Yale University Resources
- Professional Bootcamp (e.g. LinkedIn workshop)
- Visits of New Haven area
- Last Saturday at the Museum: tour of the Yale University Art Gallery and Yale Center for British Art
- Advocacy workshop: "Uncouscious Bias", "Bystander Intervention", "Discovering culture through martial arts", etc.
- Reception at the Yale Club in New York City.
