= YHSS =

YHSS may refer to:

- Yangchenphug Higher Secondary School, a co-ed public high school in Thimphu, Bhutan
- Yuhua Secondary School, a secondary school in Jurong West, Singapore
