= YER =

YER may refer to:

- Yemeni rial, the currency of the Republic of Yemen, ISO currency code YER
- Fort Severn Airport, Ontario, Canada, IATA airport code YER
- Tarok language, ISO 639-3 language code yer
