= YL =

YL may refer to:

- YL (rapper), Hispanic American rapper from Chicago
- YL (rapper), French rapper of Algerian origin
- YL Male Voice Choir, a Finnish choir, formerly Helsinki University Chorus
- Yamal Airlines, a Russian airline
- Year of Love (Y.L.), an alternative to Anno Domini (A.D.) developed by Ezra Heywood
- Yellow Line (Washington Metro)
- Yorba Linda, California, a suburb of Los Angeles, United States
- YL, Morse Code for Young lady
- Young Life, a non-denominational Christian ministry in the United States
- YL, a country prefix for aircraft registered in Latvia

== See also ==
- The suffix -yl, used in organic chemistry to form names of radicals, either separate species (called free radicals) or chemically bonded parts of molecules (called moieties).
- YL v Birmingham CC, a 2007 UK constitutional law case, concerning judicial review.
- Young Ladies Radio League, referring in telegraphy and amateur radio to a female operator of any age
