= Yb =

YB or Yb may refer to:

== Arts and entertainment ==
- YB (band), a South Korean rock band (short for Yoon Do Hyun Band)
- YoungBoy Never Broke Again (born 1999), American rapper
- Young Buck (born 1981), rapper

== Businesses and organizations ==
- Youngstown Belt Railroad, a part of the Ohio Central Railroad System
- Ypatingasis būrys, a Nazi killing squad primarily composed of Lithuanian volunteers
- BSC Young Boys, a Swiss football club

== Computing ==
- Yottabit (Yb), a unit of information used, for example, to quantify computer memory or storage capacity
- Yottabyte (YB), a unit of information used, for example, to quantify computer memory or storage capacity

== Other uses ==
- Yb, Russia, a rural locality in the Komi Republic
- Yang Berhormat, Malay for The Honorable, styled before Members of Parliament
- Ytterbium, symbol Yb, a chemical element
- YB, vehicle registration prefix for rickshaws in Yogyakarta, Indonesia
