= YPO =

YPO may refer to:

- Yorkshire Purchasing Organisation
- Young Patriots Organization, American left-wing organization of the 1960s and 1970s
- Young Presidents' Organization, a global network of young chief executives
- Yellowknife Post Office
- Yerington Post Office
- Yungaburra Post Office, Queensland, Australia
- Peawanuck Airport, Peawanuck, Ontario, Canada
