= YJ =

YJ or yJ may refer to:

Arts and entertainment:

- Yahoo! Japan, a website
- Young Justice, a DC comic series
  - Young Justice (TV series), TV series aired on Cartoon Network
    - Young Justice: Legacy, video games based on the TV series
- Yakitate!! Japan, an anime
- Weekly Young Jump, a magazine

Other uses:

- Yoctojoule (yJ = 10^{−24} J), an SI unit of energy
- Yottajoule (YJ = 10^{24} J), an SI unit of energy
- Jeep Wrangler, an SUV
- Young Judaea, a Zionist youth movement
