= Yorktown High School =

Yorktown High School may refer to:

- Yorktown High School (Yorktown, Indiana)
- Yorktown High School (New York), Yorktown Heights, New York
- Yorktown High School (Texas), Yorktown, Texas
- Yorktown High School (Arlington County, Virginia)
- York High School (Yorktown, Virginia)
