= Jora =

Jora may be:

- Jora language (Siriono), a Tupí–Guaraní language of eastern Bolivia
- Chicha de jora, a type of corn beer
- Jora Vision, Dutch design company

== Places ==
- Jora, Kenya
- Jora de Mijloc, Moldova
- Jora Wielka, Poland
- Jora Bangla Temple, Bangladesh
- Jora Mała, Poland

== People ==
- Mihail Jora, Romanian composer, pianist, and conductor
- Nawang Rigzin Jora, Indian politician
- Jora Harutyunyan
- Jora Singh, Indian decathlete

== See also ==
- Joram (disambiguation)
- Iora, a genus of passerine birds of India
- Jora Jora, a type of aircraft
- Jora 10 Numbaria, a 2017 Indian Punjabi-language gangster film
  - Jora: The Second Chapter, its 2020 sequel
