= YMM =

YMM may refer to:

- Fort McMurray International Airport, by IATA code
- YMM registers in the x86 microprocessor instruction set Advanced Vector Extensions
- Maay Maay language (ISO 639-3 code ymm)
