= Yet Another Previewer =

Document previewing application

Yet Another Previewer (or YAP) is the name of two different document previewing applications, one for DVI and one for PostScript.

== PostScript ==
The YAP for PostScript previewing is used to dynamically edit and re-render PostScript as if one was editing a file, unlike the actual PostScript interpreter itself (such as ghostscript), which deals with PostScript input interactively from a user.

YAP first was bundled with the NeXT demos package of NeXTSTEP, which was also bundled with OPENSTEP. It was not carried into its incarnation as Mac OS X, presumably because of PostScript's lessened importance with the OS X subsystems relying on Display PDF instead.

== DVI ==
The YAP for DVI viewing is a program bundled with the widely used MiKTeX TeX distribution for the Microsoft Windows platform. YAP allows zooming in and out by several integer factors, besides having a "magnifying glass" feature for local zooming. It supports PostScript specials (for instance, rendering LaTeX documents with PSTricks). Since YAP supports inverse search (when the DVI file was compiled with source specials), it can be configured to launch a LaTeX editor for the source file, placing the cursor on the corresponding word under the cursor in YAP. However, unlike PDF, there is no search facility. YAP is free software published under the GNU GPL.

It was written by Christian Schenk.

== See also ==
- Yet Another
