= YH =

YH may refer to:

- Yorkshire and the Humber, a region of England
- Youth hostel, short-term accommodation
- Yellowhead Highway
- YH-32 Hornet, a helicopter built by Hiller Aircraft
- A US Navy hull classification symbol: Ambulance boat / Small medical support vessel (YH)
