= YG =

YG and variants may refer to:

== Arts and entertainment ==
- YG Entertainment, a Korean entertainment company
- Young Guns (band), an alternative rock band from Buckinghamshire, United Kingdom

== People ==
- Yang Hyun-suk, a Korean rapper and the founder of YG Entertainment
- YG (rapper) (born 1990), a rapper from Compton, California, United States
- YG Marley (born 2001), a reggae singer-songwriter

== Others ==
- Young Greens (disambiguation), one of several youth wings of Green parties (or members thereof)
- Yoctogram (yg), an SI unit of mass
- Yottagram (Yg), an SI unit of mass
- A US Navy hull classification symbol: Garbage barge (YG)
