= YT =

YT, Yt or yt may refer to:

== Media ==
- YouTube, an American online video platform often shortened to "YT"

== People ==
- YT (rapper) (born 2001), English UK underground rapper
- Y.T., a character in the novel Snow Crash by Neal Stephenson
- Winnie Yu Tsang (born 1954), Hong Kong radio personality
- Jia Yueting (English nickname "YT", born 1973), Chinese entrepreneur
- Chau Yan Ting (born 1989), Hong Kong singer

== Places ==
- YT, the ISO 3166-1 alpha-2 code for Mayotte
  - .yt, the Internet top-level domain for Mayotte
- Yukon (formerly Yukon Territory) in Canada

== Science and technology ==
- Yt antigen system, a human blood group system
- Yottatesla, an SI unit of magnetic flux density
- Yttrium, a chemical element with the former symbol Yt

== Transportation ==
- Air Togo, IATA airline designator YT
- Yard tug (YT), one of the US Navy hull classification symbols

== See also ==
- Y&T, an American hard rock/heavy metal band
- Whitey (slang)
- YT Industries, a German mountain bike manufacturer
