= YSA =

YSA may refer to:

== People and fictional characters ==
- Ysa C (born 2001), Colombian singer and songwriter based in Africa

== Organizations ==
- Young Scientists of Australia, an organization dedicated to the promotion of science in Australia
- Young Single Adult, a designation in The Church of Jesus Christ of Latter-day Saints for unmarried people between the ages of 18 and 30, see Single adult (LDS Church)
- Youth Service America, a U.S. organization promoting increased opportunities for youth voice and service learning
- Young Socialist Alliance, the youth organization of the U.S. Socialist Workers Party
