= Yorktown High School (Texas) =

Location
- 331 Main Street; Yorktown, Texas 78164; United States; 28°58′46″N 97°30′32″W

Information
- School type: Public, high school
- School district: Yorktown Independent School District
- Teaching staff: 18.18 (FTE) (2018–19)
- Grades: 9-12
- Enrollment: 156 (2018–19)
- Student to teacher ratio: 8.58:1 (2018–19)
- Colors: Black & Gold
- Athletics conference: UIL Class AA
- Mascot: Wildcats/Kittykats
- Website: secondary.yisd.org

Yorktown High School is a public high school located in Yorktown, Texas (U.S.) and classified as a 2A school by the UIL. It is part of the Yorktown Independent School District located in southwestern DeWitt County. In 2015, the school was rated "Met Standard" by the Texas Education Agency.

== Athletics ==
The Yorktown Wildcats compete in the following sports -

- Baseball
- Basketball
- Cross Country
- Football
- Golf
- Powerlifting
- Softball
- Tennis
- Track and Field
- Volleyball

=== State Titles ===
- One Act Play -
  - 1995(2A)
