= Eleanor Dodson =

Australian biologist

- Born: Australia
- Education: University of Melbourne
- Known for: Computational modelling of protein crystallography
- Spouse: Guy Dodson
- Children: 4
- Awards: FRS
- Scientific career
- Fields: Biology, crystallography
- Workplaces: University of York
- Website: www.york.ac.uk/chemistry/people/edodson/

Eleanor Joy Dodson FRS (née MacPherson) is an Australian-born computational structural biologist who specialises in the computational modelling of protein crystallography.

== Early life and education ==
She was born Eleanor MacPherson in rural Australia, the daughter of Scottish farmers, and graduated from the University of Melbourne in 1958 with a degree in mathematics and philosophy. After travelling to the United Kingdom, she joined the Oxford laboratory of Dorothy Hodgkin as a technical assistant, where she began working on the computational and mathematical problems involved in X-ray crystallography of large biological molecules. In Hodgkin's group she contributed to the long-running effort to determine the structure of insulin, bringing mathematical and computational methods into a field that had previously depended heavily on manual calculation and model building.

== Crystallographic methods, CCP4 and REFMAC ==
Dodson is best known for her work on computational methods for biological macromolecular crystallography, especially in molecular replacement, phasing and refinement. She was a founding figure in the development of CCP4, the collaborative software suite for protein crystallography established in 1979, and later became one of its scientific leaders. Her work helped turn advanced crystallographic theory into widely used, standardised software that could be used by both specialists and non-specialists, contributing to the broad adoption of structural methods in biology and medicine.

A major strand of Dodson's methodological work is the development of refinement procedures implemented in the program REFMAC. Dodson is one of the authors of REFMAC Refinement of Macromolecular Structures by the Maximum-Likelihood Method (1997), by G. N. Murshudov, A. A. Vagin and E. J. Dodson as well as subsequent papers on the incorporation of prior phase information and anisotropic refinement. These methods became central to modern crystallographic model refinement and are among the most highly cited contributions associated with her career.

== Education and service to the crystallographic community ==
Dodson is widely recognised for her role as a teacher and mentor in crystallography. The Fankuchen Memorial Award, which she received in 1998, cited her both for major computational contributions to macromolecular crystallography and for teaching "countless students" to use the resulting programs. The Royal Society has described her as "a great teacher and influencer in the field of protein crystallography" who taught widely, while the citation for the Max Perutz Prize praised her for "developing, implementing, teaching and applying the best tools available to produce macromolecular structures of highest quality". Her international influence also lay in helping make CCP4 freely available worldwide, standardising the computational practice of protein crystallography for academic and industrial users.

== Contributions to major structure determinations ==
Dodson contributed to a number of influential macromolecular structure determinations. As part of Dorothy Hodgkin's Oxford group, she was a co-author on the 1969 Nature paper reporting the structure of rhombohedral 2-zinc insulin crystals, one of the landmark early results in protein crystallography. She was also a co-author on later studies of insulin crystal forms and higher-resolution analyses, including Structure of insulin in 4-zinc insulin (1976) and The structure of 2Zn pig insulin crystals at 1.5 Å resolution (1988).

She was also a co-author on the 1991 Nature paper describing the crystal structure of an N-terminal fragment of the Escherichia coli DNA gyrase B protein, an important advance in understanding the mechanism of this essential bacterial enzyme. Other highly cited structural papers on which she was a co-author include the 1990 Nature report A serine protease triad forms the catalytic centre of a triacylglycerol lipase, one of the early landmark lipase structures, and the 1995 Nature paper Penicillin acylase has a single-amino-acid catalytic centre.

== Eleanor and Guy Dodson Building ==
In 2023 the University of York formally opened the Eleanor and Guy Dodson Building, named after Eleanor Dodson and her husband Guy Dodson, who had arrived in York in 1976 and founded the York Structural Biology Laboratory. The building houses the equipment and specialist staff required for biomolecular structure determination and brings together the three principal techniques of structural biology: X-ray crystallography, cryo-electron microscopy and nuclear magnetic resonance spectroscopy. It serves the York Structural Biology Laboratory, other University of York researchers, and external academic and industrial users.

She holds a chair in the Department of Chemistry at the University of York. She is the widow of the scientist Guy Dodson.

== Personal life ==
She was married to fellow scientist Guy Dodson until his death in 2012. They have four children: Vicki, Richard, Philip and Tom.

== Awards ==
- 1998 Fankuchen Memorial Award of the ACA
- 2001 Honorary Degree of Doctor of Science, University of Uppsala
- 2003 Fellow of the Royal Society
- 2006 2nd Max Perutz ECA Prize
- 2010 Honorary Degree of Doctor of Science, University of St Andrews
- 2011 9th IUCr Ewald Prize

== Works ==
- Dodson EJ (2001). "Using electron-microscopy images as a model for molecular replacement". Acta Crystallographica D. 57 (Pt 10): 1405–9. Bibcode:2001AcCrD..57.1405D. doi:10.1107/s0907444901013415. PMID 11567152.
- Dauter Z, Dauter M, Dodson E (2002). "Jolly SAD". Acta Crystallographica D. 58 (Pt 3): 494–506. doi:10.1107/S090744490200118X. PMID 11856836.
- Kleywegt GJ, Henrick K, Dodson EJ, van Aalten DM (2003). "Pound-wise but penny-foolish: How well do micromolecules fare in macromolecular refinement?". Structure. 11 (9): 1051–9. doi:10.1016/s0969-2126(03)00186-2. PMID 12962624.
- Yao J, Woolfson MM, Wilson KS, Dodson EJ (2005). "A modified ACORN to solve protein structures at resolutions of 1.7 A or better". Acta Crystallographica D. 61 (Pt 11): 1465–75. Bibcode:2005AcCrD..61.1465J. doi:10.1107/S090744490502576X. PMID 16239723.
