= Joram Rozov =

Israeli artist

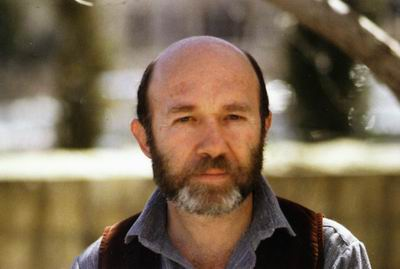
- Born: 1935 (age 90–91)
- Education: Professor
- Alma mater: Bezalel Academy of Art and Design
- Occupation: Artist

Joram Rozov (Hebrew: יורם רוזוב; born 1938) is an Israeli artist. He was a professor of art at Bezalel Academy of Arts and Design.

== Biography ==
Joram Rozov was born in Hadera, Israel. In 1958-1962, he studied at the Bezalel Academy of Art and Design in Jerusalem. In 1962-1966, he studied at the Academy of Art in Florence, Italy. After returning to Israel, he taught art and music at Hadera High School. In 1970, taught at the Youth Wing of the Israel Museum. In 1965-1974, he served as dean of students at Bezalel. In 1971-1973, he taught at Cape College in Cape Town, South Africa.

== Artistic style ==
Many of Rosov's realist paintings document his immediate surroundings. He paints landscapes of the Galilee, Hebron, Africa and Tuscany, as well as views of foliage, trees and sabra bushes. Pilots and soldiers are a dominant theme in his early work. Rozov creates an atmosphere of portending destruction, with violence present in an indirect manner. His painting is typified by attention to minute detail, combining local and European painterly traditions.

== Awards and recognition ==
- 1967 UNESCO and Prince Rainier Prize at Biennale for Plastic Arts, Monaco
- 1973 Israel Council for Culture and Art, stipend for advanced studies
- 2002 Mordechai Ish-Shalom Prize for Life's Work

== Published works ==
- Landscapes and Milestones

== See also ==
- Visual arts in Israel
