= YFS =

YFS may refer to:

- Fort Simpson Airport, Northwest Territories, Canada (IATA:YFS)
- York Federation of Students, Toronto, Ontario, Canada

== See also ==
- YFS (disambiguation)
