= Islamic Circle of North America =

Islamic North American organization

- Logo of the Islamic Circle of North America
- Abbreviation: ICNA
- Formation: 1968 (1977–present form)
- Type: Islamic North American grassroots umbrella organization; 501(c)(3) organization
- Tax ID no.: 11-2925751
- Purpose: To seek the pleasure of Allah through the struggle of Iqamat-ud-Deen [establishment of the Islamic system of life] as spelled out in the Qur'an and the Sunnah of [Muhammad]
- Headquarters: 166-26 89th Avenue, Queens, New York, United States
- Region served: North America
- President: Mohsin Ansari
- Website: www.icna.org

Islamic Circle of North America (ICNA) is an Islamic North American grassroots umbrella organization. It seeks to propagate Islam and promote the Islamic way of life among American Muslims.

== History ==
ICNA is an offshoot of the Muslim Students' Association (MSA), and was founded by immigrants from South Asia. In 1971, a number of South Asian MSA members who had been involved in Islamic movements in their home countries developed an Islamic study circle (halaqa), in Montreal. This Halqa Ahbab Islami would become the predecessor of ICNA. The "Sisters Wing", its women's group, was established in 1979. And its youth organization "Young Muslims" was established in 1995.

It is smaller and more conservative than the Islamic Society of North America (ISNA), holding separate sessions at its national conventions for women. In 2002 it allowed a woman to address its annual convention for the first time. Its headquarters are in Jamaica, New York, and includes classrooms, a reading room, and a small mosque, and it has offices in Detroit, Michigan, and Oakville, Ontario.

== Views ==
According to ICNA, its goal "shall be to seek the pleasure of Allah through the struggle of Iqamat-ud-Deen establishment of the Islamic system of life as spelled out in the Qur'an and the Sunnah of Muhammad."

ICNA seeks to promote Islam and the Islamic way of life in the United States. They are active on the issues of War in Afghanistan and the Israeli–Palestinian conflict. Initially ICNA was composed of Muslim Americans of Indo-Pakistani descent who had split from ISNA.

According to Hossein Nasr, ICNA has been influenced by the ideals of Abul A'la Maududi of Pakistan, and is structured similar to the Jamaat-e-Islami, which Mawdudi founded. However, it is a separate entity from Jamaat-e-Islami. John Esposito wrote in 2004 that it had links to Jamaat-e-Islami.

ICNA strongly condemned the 2010 Times Square car bombing attempt and immediately called for punishment to the fullest extext of the law for anyone who engages in terrorism. In 2011, ICNA welcomed President Barack Obama's counter-terrorism initiatives.

== Activities ==
Its major Dawah activities include a toll-free number for non-Muslims (1-877-WhyIslam), and dawah: field trips, distribution of Islamic literature, through mosques, by mail, through media, in prisons, campus support, flyers online, and through email. WhyIslam.org is an ICNA program.

When the Jyllands-Posten Muhammad cartoons controversy broke, ICNA condemned the depiction of any prophet, from Adam to Moses to Jesus to Mohammed.

As of 2002, a dozen mosques were affiliated with ICNA.

=== Annual convention ===
ICNA's annual convention is one of the largest gatherings of American Muslims in the United States, drawing thousands of people. The 33rd annual convention, co-sponsored by the Muslim American Society, was held at the Renaissance Waverly Atlanta Hotel in Georgia. The 2007 ICNA-MAS convention, the 32nd annual convention, was reportedly attended by over 13,000 people. The 38th Annual ICNA-MAS Convention, which was themed "Islam: The Pursuit of Happiness", was attended by a record 18,000 people at the Hartford Convention Center in Connecticut.

The conventions have been held in Baltimore since 2015. An estimated 20,000 Muslims attended the 42nd ICNA-MAS convention in 2017. Many sessions addressed concerns arising from the spike of Islamophobic hate crimes in the community, such as "Combating Islamophobia", "Asserting Your Rights Under Trump Presidency", and "Working through Challenging Times".

ICNA has participated in interfaith dialogue with the U.S. Bishops' Committee for Ecumenical and Interreligious Affairs.

In January 2017, Javaid Siddiqi was elected ICNA president.

In January 2021, Mohsin Ansari was elected ICNA president.

=== Why Islam? ===
Why Islam?, headquartered in Somerset, New Jersey, is a community outreach project of the ICNA, with the objective of providing information about Islam, and debunking what it describes as popular misconceptions. Why Islam? was established in 2000. The project seeks to provide information about Islam, by dispelling popular stereotypes and common misconceptions about Islam and Muslims through various services and outreach activities. In an effort to promote peaceful co-existence and remove hatred in society through encouraging understanding, Why Islam? offers opportunities for dialogue and answers to people’s queries about Islam.

== Controversy ==
In 2009 and 2010, the Anti-Defamation League (ADL) accused ICNA of inviting extremist and anti-Semitic speakers to its conferences that serve as platforms for extremist views. ICNA responded to ADL's allegations by saying that its conferences have always been held under the objective of rejecting extremism. ICNA's statement also supported the defense of human rights for Jewish and Israeli people, but demanded the defense of human rights for Palestinians as well.
