= YC =

YC or yC may refer to:

== Arts and entertainment ==
- Yellowcard, an American pop-rock band
- Yellow Claw (DJs), Dutch DJ duo
- Yung Chris, rapper
- Yury G. Chernavsky (born 1947), a Russian-American producer, composer and songwriter

== Businesses and organizations ==
- Y Combinator, a seed-stage startup funding firm
- Yale College, the liberal arts college of Yale University
- Youth Conference (Hong Kong), a youth conference in Hong Kong
- Yugoslav Committee, founded 1915, sought independence from Austria–Hungary

== Places ==
- Yakima County, Washington
- Yellowstone Club, a private ski community in Big Sky, Montana, US
- Yuba City, California

== Science and technology ==
- Yamnaya culture (YC), an archaeological culture
- S-Video (Y/C), a signaling standard for standard definition video
- Yottacoulomb, an SI unit of electric charge
- Yoctocoulomb, another SI unit of electric charge

== Sport ==
- Yugoslav Cup

== Military ==
- A US Navy hull classification symbol: Open barge (YC)
