= YW =

YW may refer to:

- Yw (digraph)
- Air Nostrum (IATA code YW)
- Yreka Western Railroad (reporting mark YW)
- Y-Wing, a Star Wars starfighter
- A US Navy hull classification symbol: Water barge, self propelled (YW)
- Yottawatt, or 10^{24} watt
