= YYH =

YYH may refer to:

- YuYu Hakusho, a Japanese manga series written and illustrated by Yoshihiro Togashi
- YYH, the IATA code for Taloyoak Airport, Nunavut, Canada
