= YEM =

YEM may refer to:

- Yemen, the country in Southwest Asia
- Manitowaning/Manitoulin East Municipal Airport, the IATA airport code
- "You Enjoy Myself", a song by the jam band Phish
- Yemen Olympic Committee, the Olympic code for Yemen

Yem may refer to:

- Yếm, an ancient Vietnamese bodice worn by women
- Yem people, an ethnic group of southern Ethiopia
- Yem language, the language of the Yem people
- Yem Special Woreda, a region in southern Ethiopia named after the Yem people
- Tavastians, Russian name for a historic people and a modern subgroup of the Finnish people
