= York Against Cancer =

British cancer charity

York Against Cancer is a cancer charity based in York, England and founded in 1987. The charity commissioned a £700,000 mobile chemotherapy unit to serve patients of the York Teaching Hospital NHS Foundation Trust and which, when launched in July 2017, was the first of its kind in Yorkshire.
