= Young Muslim Association =

Islamic organization in the United States

- Abbreviation: YMA
- Formation: 1999
- Founder: Sayed Hassan Qazwini
- Founded at: Dearborn, Michigan, United States

The Young Muslim Association (YMA) is an Islamic organization founded in Dearborn, Michigan in 1999 by Imam Sayed Hassan Qazwini and is affiliated with the Islamic Center of America. The YMA regularly scheduled programs and events throughout the year; with Friday programs which occurred all year long in the evenings.

The stated goals of the YMA are to promote an Islamic way of life for Muslim youths. The organization tries to enhance the leadership qualities of young people within the community.
