= YK =

YK or yk may refer to:

== Places ==
- Yellowknife, Northwest Territories, the capital of the Northwest Territories of Canada
- Yogyakarta, a city in Indonesia
  - Yogyakarta railway station, a railway station in Yogyakarta (station code YK)
- Yukon, a territory in Canada (with any casing, within internet TLD .CA, and as YK for an unofficial postal abbreviation)

== In business ==
- IATA airline codes:
  - YK, former code for Cyprus Turkish Airlines (defunct since June 2010)
  - Avia Traffic Company of Kyrgyzstan (starting between June 2010 and end of 2015)
- Yugen kaisha, a form of business organization in Japan

== Other uses ==
- Yom Kippur, a Jewish Day of Atonement
- Yottakelvin, a measure of temperature equal to 1 septillion kelvin, or 1000000000000000000000000K
