= LC3 =

LC3 or LC-3 may refer to:

- LC3 (classification), a para-cycling classification
- Little Computer 3, a type of computer educational programming language
- Limestone Calcined Clay Cement, a low-carbon cement
- Fauteuil Grand Confort, a club chair designed by Le Corbusier and Charlotte Perriand
- MAP1LC3B, a protein involved in autophagy
- MAP1LC3A, a protein
- LC3 (codec), a Bluetooth audio codec
- Rocket launch sites :
  - Cape Canaveral Air Force Station Launch Complex 3, a deactivated US Air Force launch site
  - Vandenberg AFB Space Launch Complex 3, a NASA launch site that has been used by a variety of rocket systems
  - Xichang Launch Complex 3, an active rocket launch site in the People's Republic of China

== See also ==
- Launch Complex 3 (disambiguation)
- LCIII (disambiguation)
- LCCC (disambiguation)
- L3C (disambiguation)
- IC3 (disambiguation)
- LC (disambiguation)
