= Pierre-Arnoul de Marneffe =

Belgian computer scientist

Pierre-Arnoul Frédéric Guy Donat de Marneffe (August 19, 1946 – July 9, 2023) was a Belgian computer scientist and professor emeritus at the University of Liège (ULiège). He studied civil engineering (mechanics section) at the Faculté polytechnique de Mons (FPMs) and obtained a PhD in applied sciences at the University of Liège (1976), in addition he obtained a Ph.D. in Computer science at Cambridge University in 1982.

His ideas expressed in Holon Programming inspired Donald Knuth in creating WEB, the first published literate programming environment.
