= DLX =

RISC processor architecture

- Designer: John L. Hennessy and David A. Patterson
- Bits: 32-bit
- Introduced: 1994
- Version: 1.0
- Design: RISC
- Type: Load–store
- Encoding: Fixed
- Branching: Condition register
- Endianness: Bi-endian
- Extensions: None, but MDMX & MIPS-3D could be used
- Open: Yes

Registers
- General-purpose: 32 (R0=0)
- Floating point: 32 (paired DP for 32-bit)

The DLX (pronounced "Deluxe") is a RISC processor architecture designed by John L. Hennessy and David A. Patterson, the principal designers of the Stanford MIPS and the Berkeley RISC designs (respectively), the two benchmark examples of RISC design (named after the Berkeley design).

The DLX is essentially a cleaned up (and modernized) simplified Stanford MIPS CPU. The DLX has a simple 32-bit load/store architecture, somewhat unlike the modern MIPS architecture CPU. As the DLX was intended primarily for teaching purposes, the DLX design is widely used in university-level computer architecture courses.

There are two known "softcore" hardware implementations: ASPIDA and VAMP. The ASPIDA project resulted in a core with many nice features: it is open source, supports Wishbone, has an asynchronous design, supports multiple ISAs, and is ASIC proven. VAMP is a DLX-variant that was mathematically verified as part of Verisoft project. It was specified with PVS, implemented in Verilog, and runs on a Xilinx FPGA. A full stack from compiler to kernel to TCP/IP was built on it.

== History ==
In the Stanford MIPS architecture, one of the methods used to gain performance was to force all instructions to complete in one clock cycle. This forced compilers to insert "no-ops" in cases where the instruction would definitely take longer than one clock cycle. Thus input and output activities (like memory accesses) specifically forced this behaviour, leading to artificial program bloat. In general, MIPS programs were forced to have a lot of wasteful NOP instructions, a behaviour that was an unintended consequence. The DLX architecture does not force single clock cycle execution, and is therefore immune to this problem.

In the DLX design, a more modern approach to handling long instructions was used: data-forwarding and instruction reordering. In this case, the longer instructions are "stalled" in their functional units, and then re-inserted into the instruction stream when they can complete. Externally, this design behaviour makes it appear as if execution had occurred linearly.

== Instruction decoding ==
DLX instructions can be broken down into three types, R-type, I-type and J-type. R-type instructions are pure register instructions, with three register references contained in the 32-bit word. I-type instructions specify two registers, and use 16 bits to hold an immediate value. Finally J-type instructions are jumps, containing a 26-bit address.

Opcodes are 6 bits long, for a total of 64 possible basic instructions. To select one of 32 registers 5 bits are needed.

- In the case of R-type instructions this means that only 21 bits of the 32-bit word are used, which allows the lower 6 bits to be used as "extended instructions".
- The DLX can support more than 64 instructions, as long as those instructions work purely on registers. This quirk is useful for things like FPU support.

== Pipeline ==
The DLX, like the MIPS design, bases its performance on the use of an instruction pipeline. In the DLX design this is a fairly simple one, "classic" RISC in concept. The pipeline contains five stages:

IF – Instruction Fetch unit/cycle
IR<-Mem(PC)
NPC<-PC+4
Operation: Send out the PC and fetch the instruction from memory into the Instruction Register (IR); increment the PC by 4 to address the next sequential instruction. The IR is used to hold the next instruction that will be needed on subsequent clock cycles; likewise the register NPC is used to hold the next sequential PC.
ID – Instruction Decode unit
Operation: Decode the instruction and access the register file to read the registers. This unit gets instruction from IF, and extracts opcode and operand from that instruction. It also retrieves register values if requested by the operation.
EX – Execution unit/effective address cycle
Operation: The ALU operates on the operands prepared in prior cycle, performing one of the four functions depending on the DLX instruction type.
Memory Reference: Register–Register ALU instruction, Register–Immediate ALU instruction
Branch
MEM – Memory access unit
The DLX instructions active in this unit are loads, stores and branches.
Memory reference: access memory if needed. If instruction is load, data returns from memory and is placed in the LMD (load memory data) register
Branch
WB – WriteBack unit
Typically referred to as "the store unit" in modern terminology. Write the result into the register file, whether it comes from the memory system or from the ALU.

== See also ==
- Educational programming language
- LC-3
- MIX, MMIX
- MicroBlaze
- MikroSim
- OpenRISC
