= Live script =

Live script may refer to:

- Live Script, a scripting capability of MATLAB
- LiveScript, a programming language that transpiles to JavaScript
- LiveScript, the beta/pre-release name for JavaScript
