= IC3 =

IC3 may refer to:

- IC3 (train), or DSB Class MF, a Danish train
- IC3, one of the IC codes used by British police
- IC3 (certification), the Internet and Computing Core Certification
- I-C3 (In-Cell Charge Control), a type of NiMH battery patented by Rayovac
- IC3 Convention Center, convention center in Cebu City, Philippines
- Internet Crime Complaint Center, an American cyber crime task force composed of the FBI, National White Collar Crime Center and the Bureau of Justice Assistance
- An abbreviation for indole-3-carbinol
- "IC3", a song by British rapper Ghetts from his 2021 album Conflict of Interest

== See also ==
- ICCC (disambiguation)
- ISEE-3
