= ICCC =

ICCC is a four-character abbreviation with multiple meanings:

- several societies of Imperial College Union
  - Imperial College Canoe Club
  - Imperial College Caving Club
  - Imperial College Chamber Choir
- International C-Class Catamaran Championship, a match racing series for C-Class catamarans (under sail), held annually
- International Classification of Childhood Cancer, a standardized system for categorizing childhood malignancies
- International Conference on Climate Change, an annual conference of global warming deniers
- International Conference on Computational Creativity
- International Conference on Computer Communications
- International Council of Christian Churches
- International Council of Community Churches
- Italian Cultural and Community Center at the Logue House in Houston, Texas
- Iowa Central Community College

== See also ==
- IC3 (disambiguation)
- ISEE-3
