= L3C =

L3C may refer to:

- Low-profit limited liability company
- Level 3 Communications, a U.S. telco and ISP
- L-3 Communications, a U.S. satellite and aerospace company
- Aeronca L-3C, a WWII USAAC airplane

== See also ==
- 13C
- LC3 (disambiguation)
- LCCC (disambiguation)
- LLLC (disambiguation)
- I3C (disambiguation)
- LC (disambiguation)
