= DocumentCloud =

Website to search, analyze, annotate and publish documents

- Company type: Nonprofit
- Industry: Journalism; Publishing; Software
- Founded: 2009
- Headquarters: Philadelphia, Pennsylvania, United States
- Number of employees: 5
- Parent: Investigative Reporters and Editors
- Website: documentcloud.org

DocumentCloud is an open-source software as a service platform that allows users to upload, analyze, annotate, collaborate on and publish primary source documents. Since its launch in 2009, it has been used primarily by journalists to find information in the documents they gather in the course of their reporting and, in the interests of transparency, publish the documents. As of May 2023, DocumentCloud users had uploaded more than 5 million documents.

DocumentCloud's development has led to the creation of several notable open-source projects, including Backbone.js, Jammit and Underscore.js. The majority of funding for DocumentCloud has come from grants by the Knight Foundation.

== History ==
In 2009, journalists Scott Klein and Eric Umansky of ProPublica and Aron Pilhofer of The New York Times received a Knight News Challenge grant for initial development of the platform. This first version of the DocumentCloud was built by the New York Times Digital team and included Elliott Malkin and Sascha Mombartz working on design and development by Jeremy Ashkenas, Ben Koski and Jake Harris. Jeremy Ashkenas joined as lead developer, and DocumentCloud was incorporated as a nonprofit organization. By September 2009, two dozen media outlets including The Washington Post, The New York Times and the Chicago Tribune had signed on as beta testers.

A public beta was announced at the 2010 NICAR conference of Investigative Reporters and Editors (IRE), and within a year contributing news organizations had uploaded 1 million pages.

In 2011, DocumentCloud received a second Knight News Challenge grant, dissolved its own nonprofit entity, and merged with the nonprofit Investigative Reporters and Editors. Since then, IRE has assumed primary responsibility for maintenance and development of the platform as well as managing its grant funding.

DocumentCloud received a third Knight grant in summer 2014, with primary goals including improved platform stability, new features, and developing a plan for financial sustainability. Since its start, DocumentCloud accounts have been free to journalism organizations, but the organization has announced it will be implementing a pay model.

On June 11, 2018, DocumentCloud and MuckRock announced they would be merging.
