= LLLC =

LLLC may be an abbreviation for:

- La Leche League Canada
- Lafayette Library and Learning Center
- Lifelong learning centre
- Low-profit limited liability company

== See also ==
- LCCC (disambiguation)
- L3C (disambiguation)
- LC (disambiguation)
