= Lodash =

JavaScript library in the functional programming paradigm

Lodash°
- Original author: John-David Dalton
- Developer: OpenJS Foundation
- Release: April 23, 2012; 14 years ago
- Stable release: 4.18.1 / April 5, 2026; 6 months ago
- Written in: JavaScript
- Type: JavaScript library
- License: MIT
- Website: lodash.com
- Repository: github.com/lodash/lodash

Lodash is a JavaScript library which provides utility functions for common programming tasks using the functional programming paradigm.

== History ==
Lodash is a fork of Underscore.js.

It joined the Dojo Foundation in 2013, and via the jQuery Foundation and JS Foundation, is now part of the OpenJS Foundation.

== Summary ==
Lodash is a JavaScript library that helps programmers write more concise and maintainable JavaScript.

It can be broken down into several main areas:

- Utilities: for simplifying common programming tasks such as determining type as well as simplifying math operations.
- Function: simplifying binding, decorating, constraining, throttling, debouncing, currying, and changing the pointer.
- String: conversion functions for performing basic string operations, such as trimming, converting to uppercase, camel case, etc.
- Array: creating, splitting, combining, modifying, and compressing
- Collection: iterating, sorting, filtering, splitting, and building
- Object: accessing, extending, merging, defaults, and transforming
- Seq: chaining, wrapping, filtering, and testing.

It has had multiple releases, so not all functions are available in all implementations. For example, _.chunk has only been available since version 3.0.0.

== See also ==
- Underscore.js
- Prototype.js
