= Launch Complex 3 =

Launch Complex 3 may refer to:

- Cape Canaveral Air Force Station Launch Complex 3, a deactivated US Air Force launch site
- Vandenberg AFB Space Launch Complex 3, a NASA launch site that has been used by a variety of rocket systems
- Xichang Launch Complex 3, an active rocket launch site in the People's Republic of China
- Rocket Lab Launch Complex 3, an under construction space rocket launch site in Virginia, USA

== See also ==
- Launch Complex (disambiguation)
- LC3 (disambiguation)
