= LCIII =

LCIII or variation, may refer to:

- Macintosh LC III, 1990s Apple personal computer
- Late Cypriot III (LCIII), a period of the Mediterranean Bronze Age
- LC III pelvic fracture in the Young-Burgess classification
- Local Council III (LCIII), a type of local administration in Uganda; see Local Council (Uganda)
- Creative Playthings LCIII, an educational toy modular electronics experiment kit, based on the Raytheon Lectron
- Praga LC-III (aircraft), see List of aircraft (Pi–Pz)

== See also ==
- LC3 (disambiguation)
- LCII (disambiguation)
- LCI (disambiguation)
