= LCCC =

LCCC may refer to:

In cricket:

- Lancashire County Cricket Club, a county cricket club based in the North-West of England
- Leicestershire County Cricket Club, a county cricket club based in the Midlands, England

In education in the United States:

- Lake City Community College, Florida
- Lake County Community College, now the College of Lake County, Grayslake, Illinois
- Laramie County Community College, Wyoming
- Lehigh Carbon Community College, Schnecksville, Pennsylvania
- Lorain County Community College, Ohio
- Luzerne County Community College, Nanticoke, Pennsylvania

In local government:

- Limerick City and County Council, Ireland
- Lisburn and Castlereagh City Council, Northern Ireland

In other meanings:

- Lancaster County Convention Center, a convention center in Lancaster, Pennsylvania, USA
- Locally cartesian closed category in mathematics

== See also ==
- LLLC (disambiguation)
- LC3 (disambiguation)
- L3C (disambiguation)
- LC (disambiguation)
