= Computers and Typesetting =

1986 book series on digital typography by American computer scientist Donald Knuth

- Author: Donald E. Knuth
- Language: English
- Publication place: United States
- ISBN: 978-0201734164

Computers and Typesetting is a 5-volume set of books by Donald Knuth published in 1986 describing the TeX and Metafont systems for digital typography. Knuth's computers and typesetting project was the result of his frustration with the lack of decent software for the typesetting of mathematical and technical documents. The results of this project include TeX for typesetting, Metafont for font construction and the Computer Modern typefaces that are the default fonts used by TeX. In the series of five books Knuth not only describes the TeX and Metafont languages (volumes A and C), he also describes and documents the source code (in the WEB programming language) of the TeX and Metafont interpreters (volumes B and D), and the source code for the Computer Modern fonts used by TeX (volume E). The book set stands as a tour de force demonstration of literate programming.

The books themselves were typeset in the Computer Modern Roman typeface using TeX; thus, in Knuth's words, they "belong to the class of sets of books that describe precisely their own appearance".

== Volumes ==
The five volumes are published by Addison-Wesley.

1. Volume A: The TeXbook. Describes the TeX typesetting language. It is by far the most common and available of the set, as the TeX interpreter is widely used for typesetting. It is available in softcover ISBN 0-201-13448-9 (blue spiral-bound with a built-in flap for a bookmark) and hardcover ISBN 0-201-13447-0.
2. Volume B: TeX: The program. A documented listing of the source code of the TeX interpreter. The 1986 edition in hardcover is ISBN 0-201-13437-3.
3. Volume C: The METAFONTbook. Describes the METAFONT font description language. Hardcover ISBN 0-201-13445-4, softcover ISBN 0-201-13444-6.
4. Volume D: Metafont: The program. A documented listing of the source code of the Metafont interpreter. Hardcover ISBN 0-201-13438-1, paperback ISBN 0-201-60658-5.
5. Volume E: Computer Modern Typefaces. A character-by-character listing (in the Metafont language) of the source code for the Computer Modern typefaces (cmr, cmbx, cmti, etc.) used by TeX. Hardcover ISBN 0-201-13446-2, softcover ISBN 0-201-60660-7.

The set is also available as a hardcover boxed set with the latest editions as of the year 2000, ISBN 0-201-73416-8.

A jubilee edition of the Volumes A to D was published by Addison-Wesley in February 2021, incorporating all the changes made during the TeX tune-up of 2021. (Volume E remained unchanged from the 2017 edition.)
