= MuckRock =

American non-profit organization that facilitates Freedom of Information requests

- Formation: 2010
- Founder: Michael Morisy and Mitchell Kotler
- Type: Nonprofit
- Legal status: Active
- Headquarters: Boston, MA
- Location(s): 263 Huntington Ave; Boston, MA 02115-4506
- Region served: United States
- Products: FOIA Requests
- Services: FOIA Request Service
- Official language: English
- Co-Founder and Chief Executive Officer: Michael Morisy
- Co-Founder and Technical Lead: Mitchell Kotler
- Chief Operating Officer: Amanda Hickman
- Board of directors: Jim Neff, Meredith Broussard, Scott Klein, Jenny 8. Lee, Freddy Martinez, Victoria Baranetsky, Mago Torres, Rebecca Williams
- Revenue: (2013)
- Website: www.muckrock.com

MuckRock is a United States–based 501(c)(3) non-profit organization which assists anyone in filing governmental requests for information through the Freedom of Information Act (FOIA) and other public record laws around the United States, then publishes the returned information on its website and encourages journalism around it.

== History ==
MuckRock was founded by Michael Morisy and Mitchell Kotler, graduates of Cornell University. The site's beta version went online in May 2010, and was part of the Boston Globe's GlobeLab incubator program. MuckRock was granted a 501(c)(3) non-profit status by the IRS in June 2016. On June 11, 2018, MuckRock announced they would be merging with DocumentCloud.

In 2016, the FOIA Machine project merged with MuckRock. FOIA Machine is a service that helps make FOIA requests for free. FOIA Machine was a separate organization hosted by The Center for Investigative Reporting and funded by the Knight Foundation, the Reynolds Institute of Journalism, and a crowdfunding campaign. The two projects decided to merge due to their shared goals and past partnerships. MuckRock agreed to continue providing FOIA Machine for free.

== Operation ==
Filing requests for information through the Freedom of Information Act and other public record laws around the United States has been described as confusing and tedious, despite the intent that the process be public and the service available to all American citizens. MuckRock partially automates the process with an interface designed to make the filing of requests easier. Also, MuckRock acts as a middleman for processing the requests, so when a user makes a request through MuckRock, it is the staff of MuckRock who themselves make the request. When MuckRock makes the request, they note and timestamp it on their website as proof of it being made. When a reply comes to the request, MuckRock publishes and timestamps it openly so that everyone can see the reply and when it was made.

== Information shared ==
NROL 39 (National Reconnaissance Office) vector logo obtained by a MuckRock FOIA request

In 2010, MuckRock received a notice that the government had sent MuckRock information about the Supplemental Nutrition Assistance Program which was secret and that MuckRock must cease publishing it or its staff would face fines and jail time. The state later said that it would not jail MuckRock staff.

The Boston Police Department suspended an automatic number plate recognition program because of privacy concerns raised after a MuckRock request.

MuckRock made numerous requests to various United States state and federal agencies regarding their work with Booz Allen Hamilton. The response from the Federal Bureau of Investigation was a bill for $270,000 to fulfill the request.

MuckRock's request to the New York City Police Department for their guidebook on responding to FOIA requests was denied due to it being a confidential document.

== Lawsuit ==
In June 2014 MuckRock sued the CIA under the Freedom of Information Act for "consistently ignoring deadlines, refusing to work with requesters, and capriciously rejecting even routine requests for what should be clearly public information".

In 2017, the CIA put 25 years of declassified documents online. The documents were from the CIA's CREST database.

== Partners ==
The Electronic Frontier Foundation has made public records requests with MuckRock.

== See also ==
- Institute for Nonprofit News (member)
