= Jeremy Ashkenas =

American computer programmer

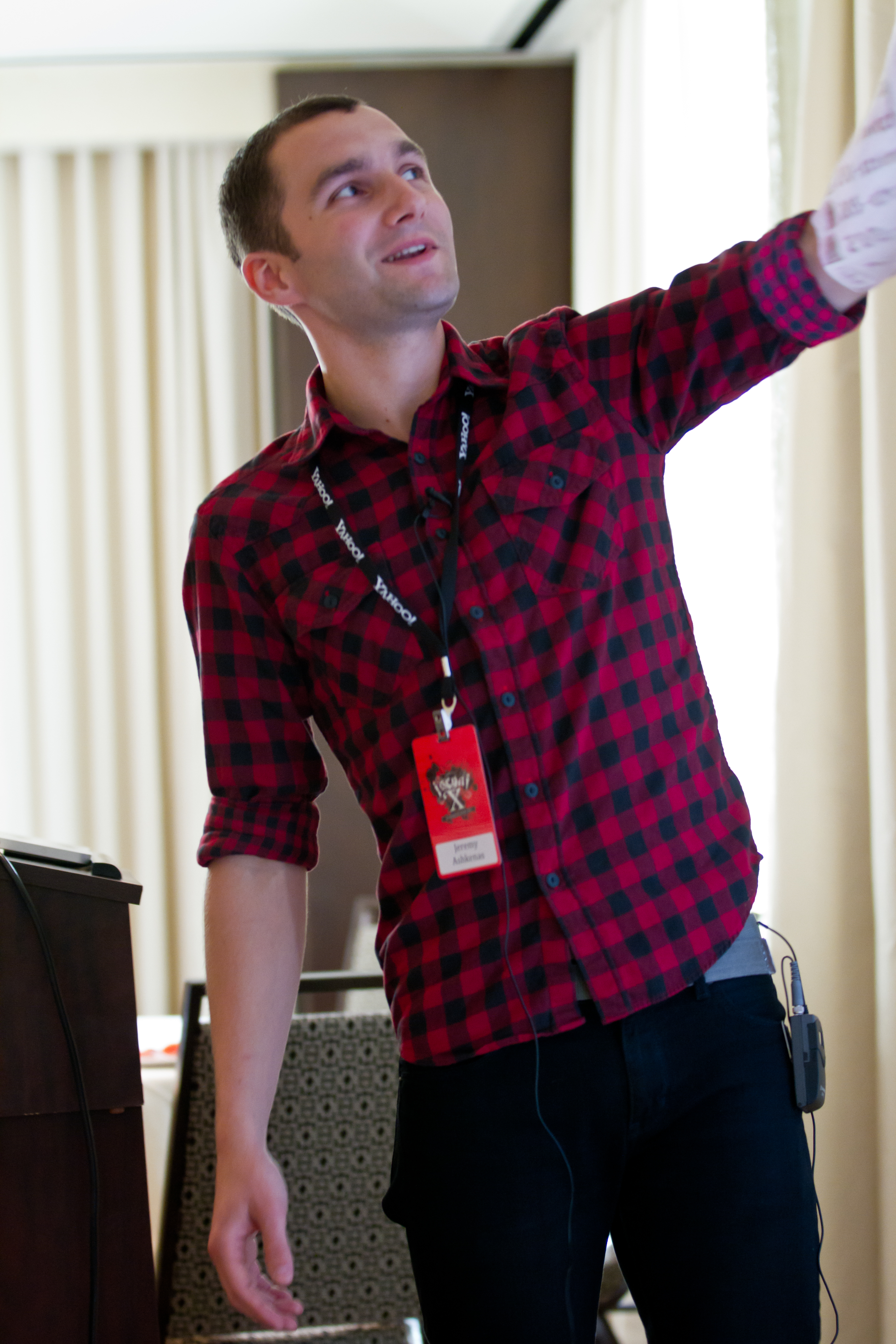
- Presenting at JSConf US 2010
- Known for: CoffeeScript, backbone.js, underscore.js, DocumentCloud
- Awards: Gerald Loeb Award; 2015
- Website: www.ashkenas.com

Jeremy Ashkenas is a computer programmer known for the creation and co-creation of the CoffeeScript and LiveScript programming languages respectively, the Backbone.js JavaScript framework and the Underscore.js JavaScript library. While working in the graphics department at The New York Times, he shared the 2015 Gerald Loeb Award for Images/Graphics/Interactives. After working at the Times, he was an employee of Observable, Inc. As of 2020, he works at Substack Inc. Jeremy returned to The New York Times in June 2022 as Director of Graphics for Opinion.
