= International Classification of Childhood Cancer =

The International Classification of Childhood Cancer (ICCC) is a standardized method for categorizing childhood malignancies set forth by the World Health Organization (WHO). This system bases malignancy classification on the histological traits of the tumor (type of tissue). This is opposed to the classification of adult malignancies, which are categorized according to the primary tumor site. The latest iteration of the ICCC is ICD-O-3/WHO 2008, which was updated to reflect hematopoietic codes.

The ICCC is made up of 12 categories:

1. Leukemias, myeloproliferative diseases, and myelodysplastic diseases
2. Lymphomas and reticuloendothelial neoplasms
3. CNS and miscellaneous intracranial and intraspinal neoplasms
4. Neuroblastoma and other peripheral nervous cell tumors
5. Retinoblastoma
6. Renal tumors
7. Hepatic tumors
8. Malignant bone tumors
9. Soft tissue and other extraosseous sarcomas
10. Germ cell tumors, trophoblastic tumors, and neoplasms of gonads
11. Other malignant epithelial neoplasms and malignant melanomas
12. Other and unspecified malignant neoplasms
