= I3C =

I3C may refer to:

- I3C (bus), an inter-integrated-circuit communication protocol evolved from I²C
- Indole-3-carbinol, a chemical found in cruciferous vegetables and some dietary supplements
