= LiveScript (programming language) =

Functional programming language

- Paradigms: Multi-paradigm, functional, object-oriented
- Designed by: Jeremy Ashkenas, Satoshi Murakami, George Zahariev
- Developers: (same)
- First appeared: 2011; 15 years ago
- Stable release: 1.6.1 / 14 July 2020; 5 years ago
- Typing discipline: Dynamic, weak
- Scope: Lexical
- OS: Cross-platform
- License: MIT
- Filename extensions: .ls
- Website: livescript.net

Influenced by
- JavaScript, Haskell, CoffeeScript, F#

LiveScript is a functional programming language that transpiles to JavaScript. It was created by Jeremy Ashkenas, the creator of CoffeeScript, along with Satoshi Muramaki, George Zahariev, and many others. (The name may be a homage to the beta name of JavaScript; for a few months in 1995, it was called LiveScript before the official release.)

== Syntax ==
LiveScript is an indirect descendant of CoffeeScript. The following "Hello, World!" program is written in LiveScript, but is also compatible with CoffeeScript:

hello = ->
  console.log 'hello, world!'

While calling a function can be done with empty parens, hello(), LiveScript treats the exclamation mark as a single-character shorthand for function calls with zero arguments: hello!

LiveScript introduces a number of other incompatible idioms:

=== Name mangling ===
At compile time, the LiveScript parser implicitly converts kebab case (dashed variables and function names) to camel case.

hello-world = ->
  console.log 'Hello, World!'

With this definition, both the following calls are valid. However, calling using the same dashed syntax is recommended.

hello-world!
helloWorld!

This does not preclude developers from using camel case explicitly or using snake case. Dashed naming is however, common in idiomatic LiveScript

=== Pipes ===
A pipe operator |> passes the result of an expression on the left of the operator as an argument to the expression on the right of it. LiveScript supports these, as do some other functional languages such as F# and Elixir; the argument passed in F# is the last one, but in Elixir is the first one.

"hello!" |> capitalize |> console.log
# > Hello!

=== Operators as functions ===
When parenthesized, operators such as not or + can be included in pipelines or called as if they are functions.

111 |> (+) 222
# > 333

(+) 1 2
# > 3
