= IC3 (certification) =

Internet and Computing Core Certification (IC3) is a global benchmark for basic computer literacy, including operating systems, hardware, software, and networks. The IC3 certifications test concepts and skills that apply to almost any school or career pathway. IC3 has multiple standards and levels, including:

- Global Standard 6 (GS6) - this is the current certification. It consists of three exams: Level 1, Level 2, and Level 3, each inclusive of all objectives but tiered by level of competence.
- Global Standard 5 (GS5) - This certification is currently available and consists of three exams: Living Online, Computing Fundamentals, and Key Applications.
- Global Standard 4 (GS4) - This version retired in 2022.
- IC3 Spark, for younger children who lack a solid foundation in digital concepts.
- IC3 Fast Track, designed to gauge the skill set of incoming students or job candidates.
- IC PHP Developer Fundamentals, designed to validate technology fundamentals required to pursue a career in software development.

The IC3 certification exams are administered by Certiport.
