= MikroSim =

Educational computer program released in 1992

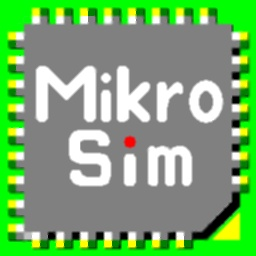

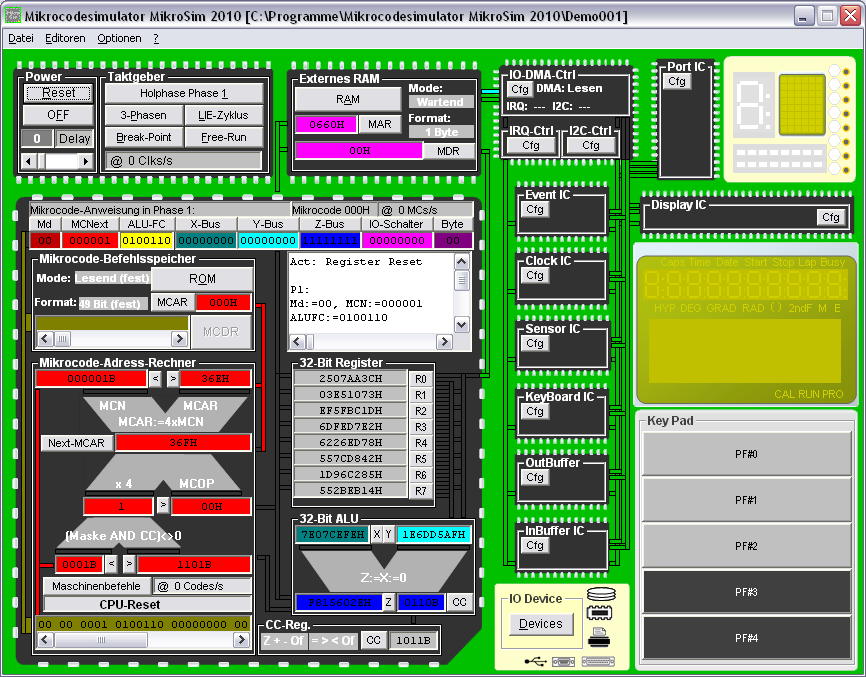
- Screenshot of MikroSim 2010
- Original author: Dr. Martin Perner of 0/1-SimWare
- Release: 1992, 33–34 years ago
- Stable release: 3.0.13 / June 20, 2012; 14 years ago
- Written in: Visual Basic
- Operating system: Microsoft Windows
- Available in: English, German
- Type: Computer simulation, Computer architecture
- License: Freeware, Shareware
- Website: www.mikrocodesimulator.de

MikroSim is an educational computer program for hardware-non-specific explanation of the general functioning and behaviour of a virtual processor running on the Microsoft Windows operating system. Devices like miniaturized calculators, microcontrollers, microprocessors, and computers can be explained by custom-developed instruction code on a register transfer level controlled by sequences of micro-instructions (microcode). Based on this, it is possible to develop an instruction set to control a virtual application board at higher level of abstraction.

== General ==
Initially, MikroSim was developed to be a processor simulation software to be widely available in educational areas. Since MikroSim operability starts on the basis of microcode development, defined as a sequence of micro instructions for a virtual control unit. The software's intention is to first approach a microcode simulator with various levels of abstractions, including the ability of CPU simulators and instruction set emulators. In the current software revision, it is feasible for a microcode controlled virtual application to operate on the own coded instruction sets. With MikroSim typical and well-known concepts in the area of computer engineering, such as computer architecture and instruction set architecture, are non-specifically treated, which have been established since the early days of the information era and being still valid. In this fashion, the simulation software gains a timeless, free didactical benefit without being restricted to special developments of the past and in the future. The detailed documentation and the bilingual application's graphical user interface (GUI) are written in both German and English, as well as being upwardly compatible, given to some extent by Microsoft's operating system Windows.

== History of development ==
The software is based on a version written under Turbo Pascal compiled for MS-DOS operating systems, which has been used for educational purposes in computer engineering and computer science at the University of Marburg in Germany until 1992. The concept was picked up by Martin Perner in summer 1992, revised, and converted into a windows application compiled with Microsoft Visual Basic and running on Windows 3.1x. In doing so, at this time, a simulator with conceptual improvements arose by exploiting the functionality and utilisation of MS Windows' GUI for supporting the composition of microcode and the traceability of its instructional influence. The enhancements of the e-learning tool under Windows was supported and promoted by the Fachbereich Mathematik/Informatik of the University of Marburg by Heinz-Peter Gumm until end 1995.

The Simulator has been awarded with the European Academic Software Award 1994 in the computer science category in Heidelberg (Germany) in November 1994. In March 1995 the simulator was presented at the computer exhibition CeBIT’95 in Hannover at the exhibit of the Hessischen Hochschulen. Between 1995 and 2000 the simulator was published as Mikrocodesimulator MikroSim 1.2 without any significant improvements. At this time the tool received an award of 1000 ECU from the European Union in conjunction with the European Year of Livelong Learning 1996. In 1997, the software was presented at the Multimedia Transfer’97 contest in connection to the LearnTec’97 exhibition. In its penultimate revision, the simulator has been published as Mikrocodesimulator MikroSim2000, optimized for MS Windows 95’s 32-bit operation.

Between 2008 and 2009, the simulator concept has been revised, reworked, and thoughtful extended. So it has received wide-ranging improvements and extensions without touching the successful conceptual aspects of the microcode simulation abilities in the core. For this purpose, advantage is taken of today's computing system's performance determined by operating system and underlying computational power to extend MikroSim's simulation possibilities up to the stage of a virtual application board. MikroSim is compiled and optimized for sake of unrestricted compatibility and for widest distribution possible for MS Windows XP as a 32-bit version. The program runs on all 32- and 64-bit operating systems of MS Windows Vista and MS Windows 7. Thereby, no special XP compatibility mode is needed. Since January 2010, the simulator is distributed as Mikrocodesimulator MikroSim 2010 by 0/1-SimWare.

== Functionality ==
The Windows application allows for the gradual establishment of a virtual application that is predetermined and, as such, unchangeable in its functionality.

In exploration mode, the operating principle and control of newly added components influenced by one microcode instruction within a cycle can be evaluated. The width of MikroSim's micro instructions is 49 bits. A single micro instruction is executed in three phases of a 3-phase clock. The partial phases are referred to as "GET", "CALCULATE" and "PUT" phase, causing to fetch some register value, to execute a 32-bit calculation, and to store the calculation result into a CPU's internal register, finally.

In simulation mode, executed micro instructions control the central processing unit of the simulator in subsequent cycles. Therefore, the intrinsic ability of one micro instruction is utilized to address the next micro instruction in the control store. The control store holding the micro instruction set (commonly referred to as "microcode") comprises 1024 micro instructions words, each 49-bit wide.

Using structuring opportunities of the control store for scheduling of the microcode and the implementation of a cyclically operating machine code interpreter, that is programmed in microcode, allows the implementation of individual micro-operation sequences. The microcode can be regarded as firmware for MikroSim, that can be modified, and stored in and reloaded from a microcode-ROM-file.

Within a micro instruction execution cycle, the CPU as well as an input / output controller is connected to an external 16 KB random access memory device (RAM). Via the input-output controller device, communication with virtual input and output devices is supported by Direct Memory Access mode (DMA), Inter-Integrated Circuit Connection (I2C), and Interrupt request functionality (IRQ). An output port, a display, a timer, an event trigger, a digital-analogue converter, a keyboard, and data input/output channel are provided as virtual IC device for explaining didactically the communication with external devices.

The microcode simulator uses eight freely usable register, each 32-bit wide, connected with a 32-bit arithmetic logic unit (ALU). The register content can be regarded as signed or unsigned integer values, or as 32-bit floating point numbers. The register content can be viewed, interpreted, and modified bitwise in an integrated system number editor.

The 32-bit ALU is the key unit of the central processing unit. It supports 128 different basic arithmetic operations for integer operation, interrupt control, and for floating point arithmetic.

The didactical approach to floating point calculations was introduced comparably in the early 1940s by Konrad Zuse. In this context, it was introduced by using elemental sublevel operations for exponent and mantissa involved in the key operations of addition/subtraction and multiplication/division. A set of 32-bit floating point arithmetic commands in mantissa and exponent for the basic operations and elementary analytical functions are provided, as they are realized in today's mathematical coprocessors. Here, in the simulation with MikroSim it is ideally assumed that the execution of each supported ALU arithmetic operation requires only a distinct computing duration independent of circuit complexity realistically needed in practice.

The execution of micro instructions can be operated on various simulation levels with different temporal resolution:

- In the lowest simulation level, the simulator supports the phased wise execution of GET, CALCULATE, and PUT phase. The processing of the partial phases is possible with an adjustable delay for better traceability.
- In the next upper layer of control, each micro-instruction is executed within a single, complete three-phase clock cycle. Multiple three-phase cycles can run back-to-back inside what is called the “Load Increment Execute” (LIE) cycle. The LIE cycle is a microcoded interpreter that repeatedly fetches instruction bytes from external RAM, increments the program counter, and branches to the microcode subroutine associated with the fetched opcode. After the subroutine finishes, control returns to the LIE cycle to retrieve the next machine instruction.
- One execution level higher, a sequence of several machine instructions are executable until a user-defined break point is reached, which is placed in the machine code sequence. It is possible to measure run times between break points. So it is possible to benchmark execution performance on machine and microcode level.
- In the top most simulation level, the microcode simulator continuously executes micro instructions without interrupt. In this level, machine instruction by machine instruction is loaded. So, it is possible to focus on the interaction of the CPU with external devices.

With various additional options, visual CPU activities can be suppressed for the benefit of increasing the processing speed when the control of the application by machine programming is put forward. The performance index monitor provided with the simulator enables the user to benchmark the processing performance of MikroSim and setting it into relation with computing power of the simulator's hardware, measurable in floating-point operations per second (FLOPS) and instructions per second (IPS).

With the "Basic Assembler Tool for MikroSim" MikroBAT, simple programs can be developed in assembler programming language. Here, all supported mnemonics of the assembler programming language are determined by the user's self-created machine's instruction set on micro instruction level. The add-on tool is able to translate the assembly language program into machine code and data and transferring the binary code into the external RAM for subsequent simulations. Together with MikroBAT the microcode simulator MikroSim supports the didactical introduction of teaching aspects in technical computer science from a switch-controlled calculating machine to an assembler programmable application.

== See also ==
- Computer architecture simulator
- Cycle Accurate Simulator
- Educational programming language
- Full system simulator
- Instruction set simulator
- Instrumentation (computer programming)
- von Neumann architecture

== Citations ==
=== Literature ===
- Gumm, Heinz Peter; Sommer, Manfred (2010). "5.6". Einführung in die Informatik (in German). Walter de Gruyter. pp. 470–485. ISBN 978-3-486-70458-7.
