= Jayanta Kumar Ghosh =

Indian statistician (1937–2017)

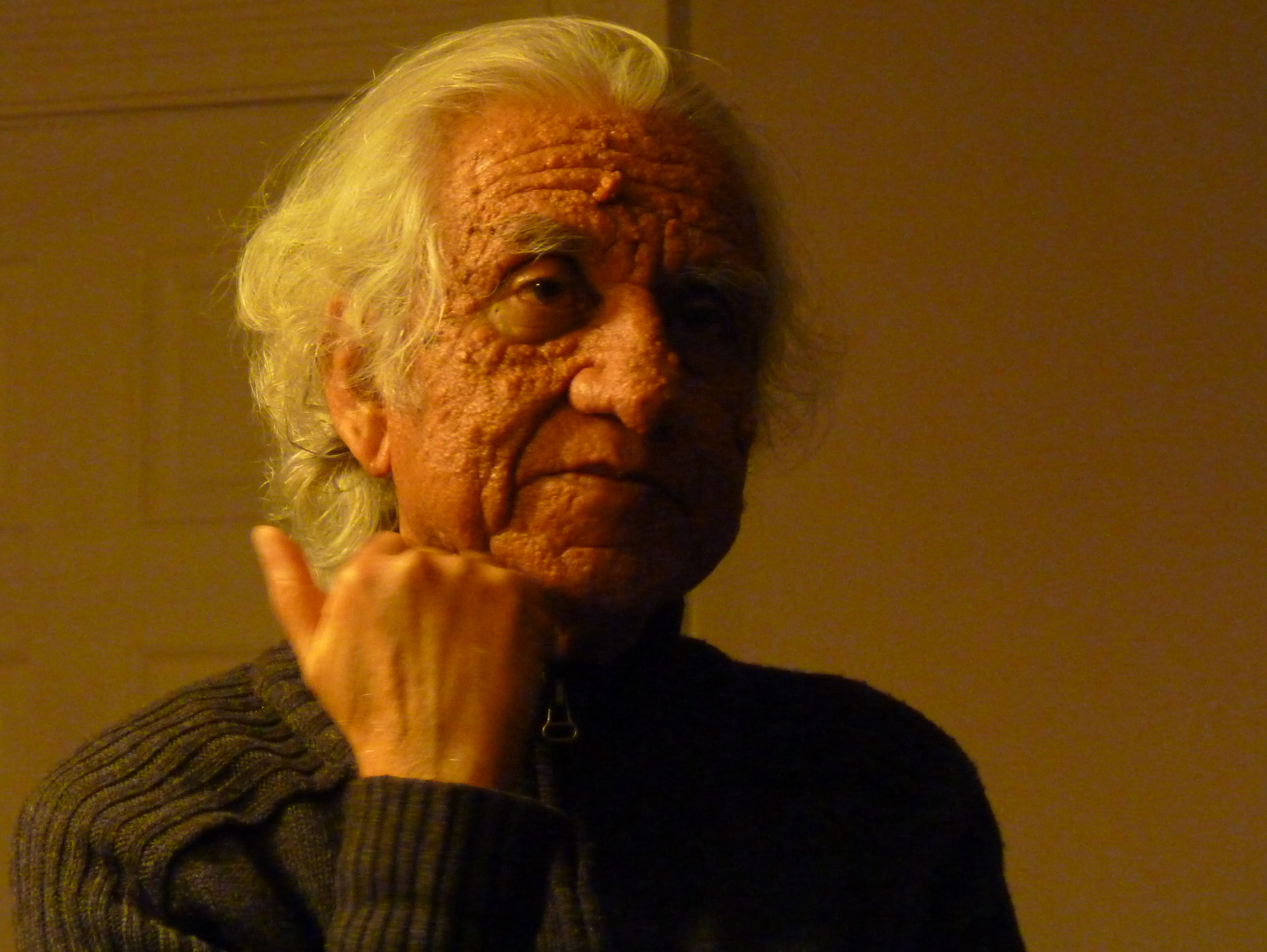
- Born: 23 May 1937; Calcutta, Bengal Province, British India
- Died: 30 September 2017 (aged 80); U.S.
- Education: University of Calcutta
- Scientific career
- Fields: Statistician
- Workplaces: Indian Statistical Institute; Purdue University

Jayanta Kumar Ghosh (Bengali: জয়ন্ত কুমার ঘোষ, 23 May 1937 – 30 September 2017) was an Indian statistician, an emeritus professor at Indian Statistical Institute and a professor of statistics at Purdue University.

== Education ==
He obtained a B.S. from Presidency College, then affiliated with the University of Calcutta, and subsequently a M.A. and a Ph.D. from the University of Calcutta under the supervision of H. K. Nandi. He started his research career in the early 1960s, studying sequential analysis as a graduate student in the department of statistics at the University of Calcutta.

== Research ==
Among his best-known discoveries are the Bahadur–Ghosh–Kiefer representation (with R. R. Bahadur and Jack Kiefer) and the Ghosh–Pratt identity along with John W. Pratt.

His research contributions fall within the fields of:

- Bayesian inference
- Asymptotics
- Modeling and model selection
- High dimensional data analysis
- Nonparametric regression and density estimation
- Survival analysis
- Statistical genetics

== Awards and honors ==
- Elected member of the International Statistical Institute
- Advisory editor, Journal of Statistical Planning and Inference
- Fellow of the Institute of Mathematical Statistics
- Fellow of the Indian National Science Academy
- Life member and director of the Calcutta Statistical Association
- Fellow of the Indian Academy of Sciences
- Japanese Society for Promotion of Sciences Fellowship, 1978
- Shanti Swarup Bhatnagar Prize for Science and Technology, 1981
- President, Statistics Section of the Indian Science Congress Association, 1991
- President, International Statistical Institute, 1993
- Mahalanobis Gold Medal of Indian Science Congress Association, 1998
- Invited speaker of the International Congress of Mathematicians, 1998
- P. V. Sukhatme Prize for Statistics, 2000
- Mahalanobis Memorial Lecture, State Science and Technology Congress, W. Bengal, 2003
- D.Sc. (h.c.), B.C. Roy Agricultural University, W. Bengal, India, 2006
- International Indian Statistical Association (IISA) Lifetime Achievement Award, 2010
- Padma Shree (2014) by the Government of India

== Bibliography ==
He has published over 50 research papers. He has also published four books, which are:

- Invariance in Testing and Estimation (Lecture Notes), 1967, published by Indian Statistical Institute, Calcutta.
- Higher Order Asymptotics (based on CBMS-NSF lecture), published jointly by Institute of Mathematical Statistics and American Statistical Association, 1994.
- (with R.V. Ramamoorthi) Bayesian Nonparametrics (Springer 2003).
- (with Mohan Delampady and Tapas Samanta) An Introduction to Bayesian Analysis - Theory and Methods, Springer 2006.
