= Ternary search =

Algorithm for finding the extrema of a unimodal function

A ternary search algorithm is a technique in computer science for finding the minimum or maximum of a unimodal function.

== The function ==
Assume we are looking for a maximum of $f(x)$ and that we know the maximum lies somewhere between $A$ and $B$. For the algorithm to be applicable, there must be some value $x$ such that

- for all $a, b$ with $A \leq a < b \leq x$, we have $f(a) < f(b)$, and
- for all $a, b$ with $x \leq a < b \leq B$, we have $f(a) > f(b)$.

== Algorithm ==
Let $f(x)$ be a unimodal function on some interval $[l; r]$. Take any two points $m_1$ and $m_2$ in this segment: $l < m_1 < m_2 < r$. Then there are three possibilities:

- if $f(m_1) < f(m_2)$, then the required maximum can not be located on the left side – $[l; m_1]$. It means that the maximum further makes sense to look only in the interval $[m_1; r]$
- if $f(m_1) > f(m_2)$, that the situation is similar to the previous, up to symmetry. Now, the required maximum can not be in the right side – $[m_2; r]$, so go to the segment $[l; m_2]$
- if $f(m_1) = f(m_2)$, then the search should be conducted in $[m_1; m_2]$, but this case can be attributed to any of the previous two (in order to simplify the code). Sooner or later the length of the segment will be a little less than a predetermined constant, and the process can be stopped.

choice points $m_1$ and $m_2$:

- $m_1 = l + (r - l) / 3$
- $m_2 = r - (r - l) / 3$

Run time order
$T(n) = T(2n/3) + O(1) = \Theta(\log n)$ (by the Master Theorem)

=== Recursive algorithm ===
def ternary_search(f, left, right, absolute_precision) -> float:
    """Left and right are the current bounds;
    the maximum is between them.
    """
    if abs(right - left) < absolute_precision:
        return (left + right) / 2

    left_third = (2 * left + right) / 3
    right_third = (left + 2 * right) / 3

    if f(left_third) < f(right_third):
        return ternary_search(f, left_third, right, absolute_precision)
    else:
        return ternary_search(f, left, right_third, absolute_precision)

=== Iterative algorithm ===
def ternary_search(f, left, right, absolute_precision) -> float:
    """Find maximum of unimodal function f() within [left, right].
    To find the minimum, reverse the if/else statement or reverse the comparison.
    """
    while abs(right - left) >= absolute_precision:
        left_third = left + (right - left) / 3
        right_third = right - (right - left) / 3

        if f(left_third) < f(right_third):
            left = left_third
        else:
            right = right_third

    # Left and right are the current bounds; the maximum is between them
    return (left + right) / 2

== See also ==
- Newton's method in optimization (can be used to search for where the derivative is zero)
- Golden-section search (similar to ternary search, useful if evaluating f takes most of the time per iteration)
- Binary search algorithm (can be used to search for where the derivative changes in sign)
- Interpolation search
- Exponential search
- Linear search
