= List of academic statistical associations =

Statistics is the study of the collection, organization, analysis, and interpretation of data. It deals with all aspects of this, including the planning of data collection in terms of the design of surveys and experiments. This is a list of academic statistical associations.

== International statistical societies ==
- Calcutta Statistical Association
- Institute of Mathematical Statistics
- International Biometric Society
- International Society for Bayesian Analysis
- International Statistical Institute (ISI)
- Statisticians in the Pharmaceutical Industry (PSI)

== National statistical societies ==
- American Statistical Association
- Indian Statistical Institute
- Irish Statistical Association
- Italian society of economics demography and statistics (SIEDS)
- Royal Statistical Society (RSS of London)
- Statistical Society of Australia
- Statistical Society of Canada

== Regional societies ==
- University Statisticians of the Southern Experiment Stations (USA)

== Statistical honor societies ==
- Mu Sigma Rho (USA)

== See also ==
- Official statistics
- Statistics
- List of statistical topics
- List of national and international statistical services
- List of mathematical societies
