= Raghu Raj Bahadur =

Indian-American statistician (1924–1997)

- Born: 30 April 1924; New Delhi, British India
- Died: 7 June 1997 (aged 73)
- Education: St. Stephen’s College, Delhi; Delhi University; University of North Carolina, Chapel Hill
- Known for: Bahadur efficiency Anderson–Bahadur algorithm Bahadur–Ghosh–Kiefer representation
- Scientific career
- Fields: Mathematical statistics
- Workplaces: University of Chicago

Raghu Raj Bahadur (30 April 1924 – 7 June 1997) was an Indian statistician considered by peers to be "one of the architects of the modern theory of mathematical statistics".

== Biography ==
Bahadur was born in Delhi, India, and received his BA (1943) and MA (1945) in mathematics from St. Stephen’s College, University of Delhi . He received his doctorate from the University of North Carolina under Herbert Robbins in 1950 after which he joined University of Chicago. He worked as a research statistician at the Indian Statistical Institute in Calcutta from 1956 to 1961. He spent the remainder of his academic career in the University of Chicago. He was a cousin to Madhur Jaffrey.

== Contributions ==
He published numerous papers and is best known for the concepts of "Bahadur efficiency" and the Bahadur–Ghosh–Kiefer representation (with J. K. Ghosh and Jack Kiefer).

He also framed the Anderson–Bahadur algorithm along with Theodore Wilbur Anderson which is used in statistics and engineering for solving binary classification problems when the underlying data have multivariate normal distributions with different covariance matrices.

== Legacy ==
He held the John Simon Guggenheim Fellowship (1968–69) and was the 1974 Wald Lecturer of the IMS. He was the President of the Institute of Mathematical Statistics during 1974–75 and was elected a Fellow of the American Academy of Arts and Sciences in 1986.
