= Ker-Chau Li =

- Born: Taiwan
- Education: National Taiwan University (BS); University of California, Berkeley (MS, PhD)
- Scientific career
- Fields: Mathematical statistics
- Institutions: Purdue University; University of California, Los Angeles; Academia Sinica
- Thesis: Contributions to Robust Design and Estimation Problems (1981)
- Doctoral advisor: Jack Kiefer

Ker-Chau Li (Chinese: 李克昭) is a Taiwanese statistician.

== Education ==
In 1975, Li graduated from National Taiwan University with a Bachelor of Science (B.S.) degree in mathematics. He then pursued graduate study in statistics at the University of California, Berkeley, where he earned his Master of Science (M.S.) in 1979 and his Ph.D. in 1981. Li's doctoral dissertation, titled "Contributions to Robust Design and Estimation Problems," was advised by Jack Kiefer.

== Career ==
Li began his teaching career as an assistant professor in the statistics department of Purdue University, then joined the mathematics department of the University of California, Los Angeles in 1984. He was promoted to a full professorship in 1989, and transferred to the newly established UCLA statistics department in 1999. In 2009, Li was appointed a distinguished professor. In his native Taiwan, Li served as editor of the Statistica Sinica, and from 2006, served as director and distinguished research fellow of Academia Sinica's Institute of Statistical Science, stepping down from the former position in 2012.

== Honors and awards ==
Li was elected a fellow of the Institute of Mathematical Statistics in 1989, awarded a Guggenheim Fellowship in 1993, and elected member of Academia Sinica and fellow of The World Academy of Sciences in 2012 and 2014, respectively.
