= Rivista italiana di economia demografia e statistica =

- Discipline: Economics, demography, statistics
- Language: English, Italian
- Edited by: Chiara Gigliarano

Publication details
- Former name: Rivista italiana di demografia e statistica
- History: 1947-present
- Publisher: Italian society of economics demography and statistics (Italy)
- Frequency: Quarterly
- Open access: Yes

Standard abbreviations
- ISO 4: Riv. Ital. Econ. Demogr. Stat.

Indexing
- ISSN: 0035-6832
- LCCN: 52028135
- OCLC no.: 8229661

Links
- Journal homepage; Online access

The Rivista italiana di economia demografia e statistica (English: "Italian Review of Economics Demography and Statistics") is a quarterly peer-reviewed open access academic journal published by the Italian society of economics demography and statistics. It covers all aspects of economics, demography, and statistics. The journal was established in 1947 as the Rivista italiana di demografia e statistica and obtained its current name in 1950. The editor-in-chief is Chiara Gigliarano.

== See also ==
- Italian society of economics demography and statistics
