= Gary Lorden =

Gary Allen Lorden
- Born: June 10, 1941; Los Angeles, California, United States
- Died: October 25, 2023 (aged 82)
- Education: California Institute of Technology; Cornell University
- Known for: Sequential analysis, change-point detection, sequential hypothesis testing, statistical methods for risk management
- Scientific career
- Fields: Statistics, Mathematics
- Workplaces: California Institute of Technology (Caltech)
- Thesis: Integrated Risk of Asymptotically Bayes Sequential Tests and Some Essentially Complete Class Results
- Doctoral advisor: Jack Carl Kiefer

Gary A. Lorden (June 10, 1941 – October 25, 2023) was an American mathematician, educator, and prominent figure in the field of applied mathematics and statistics. A professor emeritus at the California Institute of Technology (Caltech), Lorden made contributions to mathematics research, particularly in statistics and its real-world applications. He was known for his role as a technical advisor on TV show NUMB3RS, where he helped bridge the gap between mathematics and criminal justice.

== Early life and education ==
Gary Allen Lorden was born on June 10, 1941, in Los Angeles, California. He graduated from Fairfax High School in Los Angeles, where his early interest in mathematics began to take shape. Lorden then pursued higher education at the California Institute of Technology (Caltech), where he earned his Bachelor of Science (BS) degree in mathematics in 1962. Following his time at Caltech, he continued his studies at Cornell University, earning a PhD in mathematics in 1966.

== Career ==
Lorden began his academic career as an assistant professor at Northwestern University. He later joined the California Institute of Technology (Caltech) in 1968 as an assistant professor of mathematics. He was promoted to associate professor in 1971 and to full professor in 1977. Lorden retired in 2009 but remained active in the academic community as a professor emeritus. He also served as a visiting professor at the University of California, Berkeley.

Lorden's research was primarily in the field of statistics, with a focus on applying mathematical techniques to real-world problems. His expertise in statistics also led him to serve as an expert witness in legal trials, where he applied his knowledge to solving complex problems in legal contexts.

One of Lorden's most public-facing roles was as a technical advisor for the 2005 television crime drama NUMB3RS. The show, which centered on solving crimes using mathematical methods, featured Lorden's expertise on 99 of its 118 episodes. He also co-authored with fellow mathematician Keith Devlin a book titled The Numbers Behind NUMB3RS: Solving Crime with Mathematics, which explored the real-life mathematical techniques used by law enforcement agencies, including the FBI.

Lorden held several leadership positions at the California Institute of Technology. He served as dean of students from 1984 to 1988 and as vice president for student affairs from 1989 to 1998. In 2002, he served as acting vice president for student affairs, and from 2003 to 2006, he was the executive officer for the Department of Mathematics. Lorden served as chair of the Athenaeum's Board of Governors from 2010 until his death.

== Personal life and legacy ==
Lorden participated in the Caltech Playreaders series, which featured semi-staged readings of plays by members of the Caltech and JPL communities. He also contributed to the Caltech Athenaeum's wine committee.

Lorden had an interest in the arts and, in his earlier years, was an accomplished pianist. According to his longtime friend Kip S. Thorne, a professor of theoretical physics at Caltech, Lorden was known among his classmates for his imitations of Liberace during their time at Caltech.

Lorden was married to his wife Louise, who died in 2015. The couple had two daughters.

== Death ==
Lorden died on October 25, 2023, after a 10-month battle with a rare form of cancer.

== Articles ==
- Bartroff, J., Lorden, G., & Wang, L. (2022). Optimal and Fast Confidence Intervals for Hypergeometric Successes. Journal of Statistical Planning and Inference, 220, 66-77.
- Bartroff, J., Lorden, G., & Wang, L. (2021). Optimal Hypergeometric Confidence Sets are (Almost) Always Intervals. Statistics in Medicine, 40(15), 3584-3599.
- Lorden, G., & Pollak, M. (2008). Sequential Change-Point Detection Procedures That Are Nearly Optimal and Computationally Simple. Journal of the Royal Statistical Society: Series B (Statistical Methodology), 70(3), 627-644.
- Lorden,G. ( 1970) "On Excess Over the Boundary," The Annals of Mathematical Statistics, Ann. Math. Statist. 41(2), 520-527.
- Lorden, G. (1986). Multistage Tests of Hypotheses. Journal of Statistical Planning and Inference, 14(2), 111-122.
- Lorden, G. (1983). Asymptotic Efficiency of Three-Stage Hypothesis Tests. The Annals of Statistics, 11(1), 129-140.
- Lorden, G., & Pollak, M. (2005). Nonanticipating Estimation Applied to Sequential Analysis and Change-Point Detection. Journal of the American Statistical Association, 100(469), 1130-1140.
- Lorden, G., & Devlin, K. (2009). The Numbers Behind Numb3rs: Solving Crime with Mathematics. Princeton University Press. ISBN 9780452288577.
