= Calcutta Statistical Association Bulletin =

- Discipline: Statistics, probability theory
- Language: English
- Edited by: Manisha Pal, Gaurangadeb Chattopadhyay

Publication details
- History: Since 1947
- Publisher: SAGE Publishing on behalf of the Calcutta Statistical Association
- Frequency: Biannual

Standard abbreviations
- ISO 4: Calcutta Stat. Assoc. Bull.

Indexing
- ISSN: 0008-0683 (print); 2456-6462 (web)
- LCCN: 2020204965
- OCLC no.: 1086675793

Links
- Journal homepage; Online access; Online archive

The Calcutta Statistical Association Bulletin is a biannual peer-reviewed scientific journal covering the fields of statistics and probability theory. It was established in 1947 and is the official publication of the Calcutta Statistical Association, based at the University of Calcutta. Since 2016, the journal has been published on behalf of the association by SAGE Publications.

== History ==
The journal was established in August 1947, shortly after the foundation of the association in 1945. It was created to serve as a platform for the "Calcutta School" of statistics, which emerged under the influence of Prasanta Chandra Mahalanobis. The founding editor-in-chief, Hari Kinkar Nandi, directed the journal's focus toward both theoretical research and the practical applications of statistics during the post-independence era of Indian science. As of 2026, the editors-in-chief are Manisha Pal and Gaurangadeb Chattopadhyay (University of Calcutta).

== Abstracting and indexing ==
The journal is abstracted and indexed in MathSciNet, Scopus, and zbMATH Open.
