= Jack Kiefer (statistician) =

American mathematical statistician and mycologist (1924-1981)

Jack Carl Kiefer
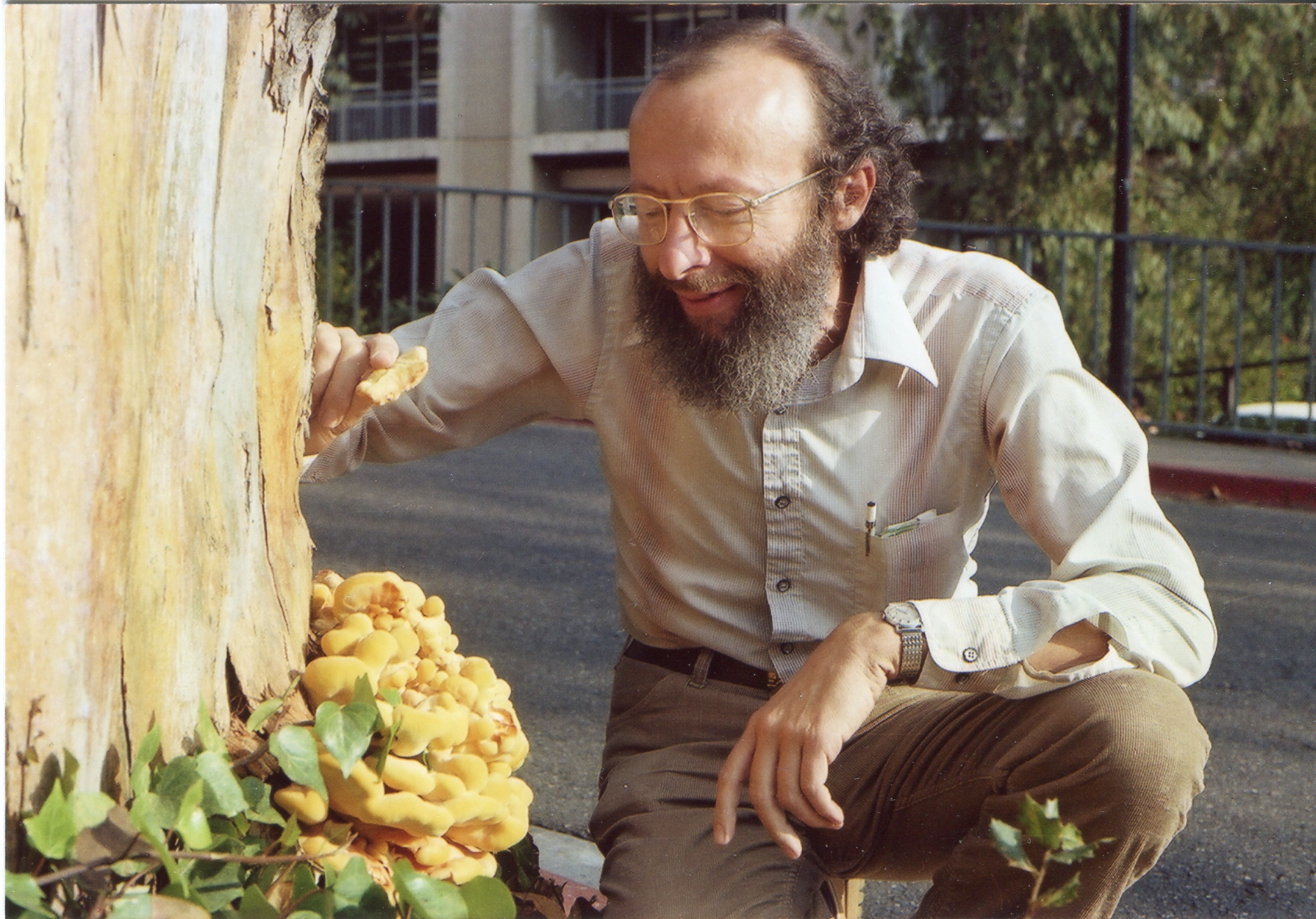
- Jack Kiefer in 1979
- Born: January 25, 1924; Cincinnati, Ohio, U.S.
- Died: August 10, 1981 (aged 57); Berkeley, California, U.S.
- Education: MIT; Columbia University
- Scientific career
- Fields: Mathematical statistics
- Workplaces: Cornell University; University of California, Berkeley
- Doctoral advisor: Abraham Wald; Jacob Wolfowitz
- Doctoral students: Lawrence D. Brown; Ker-Chau Li; Gary Lorden

Jack Carl Kiefer (January 25, 1924 – August 10, 1981) was an American mathematical statistician at Cornell University (1952 to 1979) and the University of California, Berkeley (1979 to 1981). His research interests included the optimal design of experiments, which was his major research area, as well as a wide variety of topics in mathematical statistics.

== Biography ==
Jack Kiefer was born in Cincinnati, Ohio, to Carl Jack Kiefer and Marguerite K. Rosenau. He began his undergraduate studies at the Massachusetts Institute of Technology in 1942, but left after one year, taking up a position as first lieutenant in the United States Army Air Forces during World War II, during which he taught about radar systems. In 1946, he returned to MIT, graduating with bachelor's and master's degrees in economics and engineering in 1948 under the supervision of Harold Freeman. He then began graduate studies at Columbia University, under the supervision of Abraham Wald and Jacob Wolfowitz, receiving his Ph.D. in mathematical statistics in 1952.

While still a graduate student, he began teaching at Cornell University in 1951. There was an active scene of inquiry in the fields of probability and statistics on the campus, and he became an assistant professor in 1952 and an associate professor in 1955. In 1957, he married Dooley Sciple, a former undergraduate student of his at Cornell, with whom he had two children.

He was appointed a full professor in 1959. Courses that Kiefer taught at Cornell included "Statistics" and "Sequential Analysis and Nonparametric Inference". He was an editor for several academic journals during his time there.

Kiefer was publicly active in opposition to United States involvement in the Vietnam War, in particular via tax resistance. A resident of Ithaca, New York, he was a member of county committees and executive committees of Liberal Party of New York for a number of years. In 1968, he ran for the New York State Assembly as the candidate of the Liberal Party. He waged what he called a "limited educational campaign" to highlight a choice beyond the two major parties, acknowledging that his prior probability of winning the election was zero. Incumbent Constance E. Cook was reelected, with Kiefer receiving about 4.5 percent of the vote. During the early 1970s, Kiefer was on a committee offering views to Cornell's board of trustees regarding socially responsible investing.

In 1979, he accepted early retirement from Cornell and accepted a new position as Miller Research Professor in the Department of Statistics and Mathematics at the University of California, Berkeley. Kiefer died of a heart attack in Berkeley, California on August 10, 1981.

== Awards and honors ==
Kiefer was a Fellow of the American Statistical Association and of the Institute of Mathematical Statistics, a member of the American Academy of Arts and Sciences (elected 1972) and of the United States National Academy of Sciences (elected 1975). From 1969–1970 he was president of the Institute of Mathematical Statistics.

In 1973, Kiefer and the physicist-chemist-mathematician Michael Fisher were the first two Cornell faculty elected as Horace White Professors, a new position named after the politician and Cornell scion.

== Contributions ==
Much of Kiefer's research was on the design of experiments; the American Statistician obituary calls him "undoubtedly the foremost worker in optimal experimental design". However, he also made significant contributions to other areas of statistics and optimization, including the introduction of golden section search (his master's thesis work) the Dvoretzky–Kiefer–Wolfowitz inequality and the Bahadur-Ghosh-Kiefer representation (with R. R. Bahadur and J. K. Ghosh).

== See also ==
- Kiefer–Wolfowitz algorithm
- Hoeffding's independence test
- Strong subadditivity of quantum entropy
- Information-based complexity
