= Calcutta Statistical Association =

Professional society for statistics in India

- Formation: 1945
- Type: Non-profit learned society
- Purpose: Statistics
- Headquarters: Kolkata, West Bengal, India
- Region served: International
- Publication: Calcutta Statistical Association Bulletin
- Website: www.calcuttastatisticalassociation.in

The Calcutta Statistical Association (CSA) is a learned society dedicated to the advancement of statistical science. Established in 1945 and headquartered in Kolkata, it is one of the oldest statistical societies in Asia. The association maintains a close academic relationship with the department of statistics at the University of Calcutta, which was the first postgraduate statistics department in India.

== History ==
The association was formally established on November 9, 1945, by a group of statisticians who were faculty members at the University of Calcutta. Its creation occurred during a period of rapid development for Indian statistics and was spearheaded by Prasanta Chandra Mahalanobis, along with others such as Samarendra Nath Roy and Purnendu Kumar Bose.

The primary objective of the CSA is to provide an independent platform for research, instruction, and the dissemination of statistical knowledge, particularly for those who are not affiliated with the Indian Statistical Institute, encouraging a broader demographic of statisticians to collaborate and publish their findings.

== Publications ==
The society's primary journal, the Calcutta Statistical Association Bulletin, was first published in August 1947, coinciding with Indian independence. It is a peer-reviewed international journal covering both the theory and application of statistics and probability. Since 2016, the bulletin has been published and distributed globally by SAGE Publishing.

== Events ==
=== International symposium ===
Every three years since 1991, the CSA has organized the International Triennial Calcutta Symposium on Probability and Statistics jointly with the University of Calcutta. The symposium serves as a global forum for researchers to present advancements in statistical theory.

=== Memorial lectures ===
The association hosts several endowed lectures to honor the memory of distinguished statisticians, including Soumitra Kumar Chakravarti, Raj Chandra Bose, and Prasanta Kumar Banerjee.

== Governance and membership privileges ==
The CSA is governed by an elected council. The current offices are located within the department of statistics at the Ballygunge Circular Road campus of the University of Calcutta. The society offers several tiers of membership, including lifetime membership and ordinary membership, providing benefits such as library access and discounted journal subscriptions.

== See also ==
- Indian Statistical Institute
- List of academic statistical associations
- Raj Chandra Bose
