= John W. Pratt =

American business academic

- Born: 1931 (age 94–95)
- Education: Princeton University; Stanford University
- Scientific career
- Workplaces: Harvard University
- Thesis: Some Results in the Decision Theory of One-Parameter Multivariate Polya-Type Distributions (1956)
- Doctoral advisor: Samuel Karlin
- Doctoral students: Michael R. Powers

John Winsor Pratt (born 1931) is the William Ziegler Professor of Business Administration, Emeritus, at Harvard University. His former education was conducted at Princeton University and Stanford University, where he specialized in mathematics and statistics. Pratt spent most of his academic career at Harvard University. He was an editor of the Journal of the American Statistical Association from 1965 to 1970. His researches on risk aversion, risk sharing incentives, and the nature and discovery of stochastic laws, statistical relationships that describe the effects of decisions. He has made contributions to research in risk aversion theory, notably with Kenneth Arrow on measures of risk aversion.

In 1962 he was elected as a Fellow of the American Statistical Association.

Publications

- Introduction to Statistical Decision Theory
- The Structure of Business

Articles

- The Ghosh-Pratt theorem.
- Fair (and not so fair) Division
- How Many Balance Functions Does It Take To Determine A Utility Function?
- Efficient Risk Sharing: The Last Frontier.
- A New Interpretation of the F Statistic.
- Increasing Risk: Some Direct Constructions.
- Willingness to Pay and the Distribution of Risk and Wealth.
- The Contraction Mapping Approach to the Perron-Frobenius Theory: Why Hilbert's Metric?
- Evaluating and Comparing Projects: Simple Detection of False Alarms.

Working Papers

- Some Neglected Axioms in Fair Division.
- Correlated Equilibrium and Nash Equilibrium as an Observer's Assessment of the Game.
