= Linear search =

Sequentially looking in an array

- Class: Search algorithm
- Worst-case performance: O(n)
- Best-case performance: O(1)
- Average performance: O(n)
- Worst-case space complexity: O(1) iterative
- Optimal: Yes

In computer science, linear search or sequential search is a method for finding an element within a list. It sequentially checks each element of the list until a match is found or the whole list has been searched.

A linear search runs in linear time in the worst case, and makes at most n comparisons, where n is the length of the list. If each element is equally likely to be searched, then linear search has an average case of (n+1)/2 comparisons, but the average case can be affected if the search probabilities for each element vary. Linear search is rarely practical because other search algorithms and schemes, such as the binary search algorithm and hash tables, allow significantly faster searching for all but short lists.

== Algorithm ==
A linear search sequentially checks each element of the list until it finds an element that matches the target value. If the algorithm reaches the end of the list, the search terminates unsuccessfully.

=== Basic algorithm ===
Given a list L of n elements with values or records L_{0} .... L_{n−1}, and target value T, the following subroutine uses linear search to find the index of the target T in L.

1. Set i to 0.
2. If L_{i} = T, the search terminates successfully; return i.
3. Increase i by 1.
4. If i < n, go to step 2. Otherwise, the search terminates unsuccessfully.

We can define this in pseudocode as given below, using either an iterative or recursive approach.

function iterativeLinearSearch(list L, T) is 
    for i = 0 to length(L) do
        if L[i] == T then 
            return i
    // Return an unsuccessful value (in this case -1). 
    return -1 

function recursiveLinearSearch(list L, T, i = 0) is
    if L[i] == [T] then
        return i
    if i > length(L) then
        return -1 // Unsuccessful value. 
    return recursiveLinearSearch(L, T, i = i + 1)

=== With a sentinel ===
The basic algorithm above makes two comparisons per iteration: one to check if L_{i} equals T, and the other to check if i still points to a valid index of the list. By adding an extra record L_{n} to the list (a sentinel value) that equals the target, the second comparison can be eliminated until the end of the search, making the algorithm faster. The search will reach the sentinel if the target is not contained within the list.

1. Set i to 0.
2. If L_{i} = T, go to step 4.
3. Increase i by 1 and go to step 2.
4. If i < n, the search terminates successfully; return i. Else, the search terminates unsuccessfully.

We can define this in pseudocode as given below, using either an iterative or recursive approach.

function iterativeSentinelSearch(list L, T) is
    for i = 0 to length(L) do
        if L[i] == T then
            if i < length(L) then
                return i
            else
                return -1
    return -1

function recursiveSentinelSearch(list L, T, i = 0) is
    if i >= length(L) then
        return -1
    if L[i] == T then
        return i
    return recursiveSentinelSearch(L, T, i = i + 1)

=== In an ordered table ===
If the list is ordered such that L_{0} ≤ L_{1} ... ≤ L_{n−1}, the search can establish the absence of the target more quickly by concluding the search once L_{i} exceeds the target. This variation requires a sentinel that is greater than the target.

1. Set i to 0.
2. If L_{i} ≥ T, go to step 4.
3. Increase i by 1 and go to step 2.
4. If L_{i} = T, the search terminates successfully; return i. Else, the search terminates unsuccessfully.

We can define this in pseudocode as given below, using either an iterative or recursive approach.

function iterativeTableSearch(list L, T) is
    for i = 0 to length(L) do
        if L[i] >= T then
            if L[i] == T then
                return i
            else
                return -1
    return -1

function recursiveTableSearch(list L, T, i = 0) is
    if i >= length(L) then
        return -1
    if L[i] >= T then
        if L[i] == T then
            return i
        else
            return -1
    return recursiveTableSearch(L, T, i = i + 1)

== Analysis ==
For a list with n items, the best case is when the value is equal to the first element of the list, in which case only one comparison is needed. The worst case is when the value is not in the list (or occurs only once at the end of the list), in which case n comparisons are needed.

If the value being sought occurs k times in the list, and all orderings of the list are equally likely, the expected number of comparisons is

$$\begin{cases}
n                   & \mbox{if } k = 0 \\[5pt]
\displaystyle\frac{n + 1}{k + 1} & \mbox{if } 1 \le k \le n.
\end{cases}$$

For example, if the value being sought occurs once in the list, and all orderings of the list are equally likely, the expected number of comparisons is $\frac{n + 1}2$. However, if it is known that it occurs once, then at most n − 1 comparisons are needed, and the expected number of comparisons is

$$\displaystyle\frac{(n + 2)(n-1)}{2n}$$

(for example, for n = 2 this is 1, corresponding to a single if-then-else construct).

Either way, asymptotically the worst-case cost and the expected cost of linear search are both O(n).

=== Non-uniform probabilities ===
The performance of linear search improves if the desired value is more likely to be near the beginning of the list than to its end. Therefore, if some values are much more likely to be searched than others, it is desirable to place them at the beginning of the list.

In particular, when the list items are arranged in order of decreasing probability, and these probabilities are geometrically distributed, the cost of linear search is only O(1).

In general, if items are arranged in order of decreasing probability and the probability of searching for the ith element is $p_i$, the expected cost of a single search is $ES^{OPT} = \sum_{i=1}^n ip_i$. Under the natural assumption that the probabilities are not known in advance, or one cannot spend the time to sort the list by probabilities, one can use the approach of self-adjusting data structure and move elements towards the head of the list when they are requested in a search. Two natural heuristics for this self-adjustment are Move to Front (MF) and Transpose (T), where the requested element trades places with its predecessor. It is known that the expected cost of an access in a large sequence of independent accesses, averaged over all initial orders of the list, satisfies $ES^T \le ES^{MF} \le \frac{\pi}{2}ES^{OPT}$. In terms of amortized cost, averaging over a worst-case sequence of operations (note - among sequences satisfying the assumption on probabilities), we have $S^{MF}\le 2S^{OPT}$, while $S^T$ can be as bad as $O(mS^{OPT})$.

== Application ==
Linear search is usually very simple to implement, and is practical when the list has only a few elements, or when performing a single search in an unordered list.

When many values have to be searched in the same list, it often pays to preprocess the list in order to use a faster method. For example, one may sort the list and use binary search, or build an efficient search data structure from it. Should the content of the list change frequently, repeated reorganization may be more trouble than it is worth.

As a result, even though in theory other search algorithms may be faster than linear search (for instance binary search), in practice even on medium-sized arrays (around 100 items or less) it might be infeasible to use anything else. On larger arrays, it only makes sense to use other, faster search methods if the data is large enough, because the initial time to prepare (sort) the data is comparable to many linear searches.

== See also ==
- Ternary search
- Hash table
- Linear search problem
