= Tugboat (disambiguation) =

A tugboat is a boat that maneuvers vessels by pushing or towing them.

Tugboat may also refer to:

- TUGboat, journal of digital typography
- Tugboat (wrestler), WWE wrestler
- Tugboat Jones (1918–1988), American football player and coach
- Tugboat Taylor (1945–2017), American professional wrestler
- Tugboat Wilkinson (born 2002), American baseball player
- "Tugboat", the closing track on Galaxie 500 album Today
- "Tugboat", slang for Social Security Disability Insurance
