= TPJ =

TPJ may refer to:

- The PracTeX Journal, an online journal focussing on practical use of the TeX typesetting system
- The Perl Journal, a former journal which focused on the Perl programming language.
- Tapieté, an indigenous language of Argentina (ISO 639 code tpj).
- Temporoparietal junction, a region of brain where the temporal and parietal lobes meet.
- Texans for Public Justice, a non-profit group.
- Tiruchirappalli Junction railway station (station code TPJ).
- Tiruchirappalli Railway Division, a division of Southern Railway Zone of India (reporting mark) .
- Triple Plate Junction PLC, a gold mining and exploration company involved in the reverse takeover of Namesco.
- Tak and the Power of Juju, children's TV series and video game.
- Tevita Pangai Jr, rugby league player for the Brisbane Broncos.
