= New Typesetting System =

In digital typography, the New Typesetting System (NTS) is a discontinued reimplementation of the typesetting system TeX in Java. The specific aims of the project were to continue the tradition of Donald Knuth's TeX by providing a first-class typesetting software which is both portable and available free of charge. But whereas TeX is now frozen due to maximum stability, NTS was intended to remain flexible and extensible.

NTS is written in Java. It is alpha software (released in 2000) and it is capable of generating DVI.

== History ==
The NTS project was inaugurated under the auspices of Dante e.V. (Deutschsprachige Anwendervereinigung TeX) in 1992. Coding began in 1998, following donations totalling 30 000 DM, and was funded through to completion. Joachim Lammarsch, Rainer Schöpf, Joachim Schrod, Bernd Raichle, Karel Skoupý, Jiří Zlatuška, Philip Taylor, Peter Breitenlohner, Friedhelm Sowa and Hans Hagen, amongst others, have all been involved in this project, though not all were involved at the outset, and not all remained involved through to its completion.

The objective of the project was to re-implement TeX in a 100%-compatible way. The final product of the project is "trip-test" compatible, and demonstrates that a re-implementation is feasible. However, for several reasons it was decided not to pursue the project any further. First of all, NTS is too slow to be used for production purposes, which does not motivate users to switch to this engine. Furthermore, the by-then standard extensions such as e-TeX were not included in the code. Also, in order to be useful today, PDF output as well as pdfTeX-specific extensions need to be implemented. Finally, by being 100%-compatible with TeX, the sub-processes of NTS are rather interwoven (due to the nature of traditional TeX), which thereby makes the task of adding extensions less simple than had been envisaged.

In December 2002, a group of people started a reimplementation of TeX project based on NTS: the ExTeX project. ExTeX is a merger of NTS with eTeX, pdfTeX and Omega and has never left pre-alpha state. Aleph is also a merge of eTeX and Omega with, and since LuaTeX integrates most of the functionally provided by Aleph with pdfTeX, it can be considered a realization of NTS and ExTeX ideas.

XeTeX provides similar functionality, but in a different way.
