= Texas All-Star Wrestling =

Professional wrestling promotion

- Acronym: TASW
- Founded: January 15, 1994
- Style: American Wrestling
- Headquarters: Humble, Texas
- Founder: Bob Murphy
- Owner: Bob Murphy (1994-)
- Website: TASWwrestling.com

Texas All-Star Wrestling (TASW) is a professional wrestling promotion that was established by Bob Murphy in Humble, Texas in 1994. It is the oldest independent promotion in the state of Texas and one of two based in the Greater Houston area along with Booker T's Reality of Wrestling.

It was the first successful wrestling promotion to open in Texas following the closing of World Class Championship Wrestling in 1990, and the Global Wrestling Federation in 1994. It not only remained the only major "indy" promotion in the state during the 1990s but is one of the oldest wrestling promotions in operation in the United States. The promotion has been profiled by both the Houston Press and the Houston Chronicle. Ken Hoffman, a longtime columnist for the Chronicle, has participated in several wrestling matches for charity. The Galveston County Daily News has called TASW the top promotion in the entire state.

Necro Butcher and Shawn Hernandez, both started their careers in TASW. Samoa Joe, Harlem Heat 2000 (Big T and Stevie Ray) from World Championship Wrestling, and Tammy Lynn Sytch, Christy Hemme and Daivari from World Wrestling Entertainment have all made appearances for the promotion as well as older wrestlers such as Abdullah the Butcher, Kamala and "Hacksaw" Jim Duggan, the latter holding the promotion's heavyweight title in 2003.

== History ==
=== Background and early history ===
Texas All-Star Wrestling was started by Bob Murphy, a 10-year veteran who wrestled throughout Texas during the 1980s, who grew frustrated with the unethical business practices of small-time promoters following the collapse of the NWA territory system at the end of the decade. With the civic center yet to be built, he considered using Humble High School or another venue in the local area. Murphy and his then tag team partner rented out a bingo hall by U.S. Route 59 in Humble, Texas and promised the owner, Casey Musick, $500 plus the proceeds from the concession stand. Renaming the building the "Humble Bingo Arena", they held their first show on January 15, 1994, which was attended by 450 fans and brought in over $2,000. The promotion established its first championship titles between December 1994 and December 1996.

Professional wrestling had been very popular in Houston, especially during the 1970s and 1980s, but had considerably declined in the years following the retirement of legendary wrestling personality Paul Boesch in 1987. It was not until the close of World Class Championship Wrestling in 1990, and the Global Wrestling Federation in 1994, that Murphy began promoting wrestling events after an absence of several years. It was the first successful independent promotion in Texas and, with the exception of occasional events held by Tugboat Taylor at Hofheinz Pavilion, remained the only organization in the entire state for nearly a decade.

The shows immediately found an audience with its traditional Southern-style wrestling, rather than the "sports entertainment" favored by mainstream promotions such as World Championship Wrestling and the World Wrestling Federation, and established a strong and loyal following in the Greater Houston area. Many fans were so enthusiastic at the events that many wanted to participate themselves prompting Murphy to open a small gym in the back of the Humble Bingo Arena in 1996. Within two years, this eventually evolved into the present-day training facility and wrestling school where many of the top wrestlers on the Texas "indy" circuit would be trained, most notably, Shawn "Hot Stuff" Hernandez. Prospective students of the school were required to volunteer at events in roles such as refereeing matches, escorting wrestlers to the ring as a "valet" or acting as security for several months prior to their first match. The entire training period generally took six months to one year, though some students graduated within four to five months.

Humongous defended the TASW Heavyweight Championship against Abdullah the Butcher at the Humble Bingo Arena on March 22, 1997. Older veterans such as "Mean" Mike Tatum, "Hacksaw" Jim Duggan and Kamala the Ugandan Giant also had short stints in the promotion. Both Tatum and Duggan held the TASW Heavyweight Championship during the early-2000s. Although speculated to become a major promotion, Murphy himself said in interviews that he was unconcerned about the expansion of the company and instead wanted to focus on developing younger locally based talent and "help them make it to the next level". In addition to its Houston-based roster, Texas independent wrestlers Rasta Savage and Necro Butcher also regularly competed in the promotion. Later stars to emerge during the next decade included Bobby 2-Badd, Mr. Mayhem, Zen-Zen, VooDoo the Xecutioner, Nasty Nick Daniels, Dylan Starr and Nark the Nevulon. River City Wrestling's Joey "Super Shot" Spector, an alumnus of the Texas Wrestling Academy, also wrestled for the promotion early in his career.

=== Ken Hoffman and The Houston Chronicle ===
On January 16, 1999, at the TASW's 6th annual "Rumble in Humble" supercard, Houston Chronicle columnist Ken Hoffman made his pro wrestling debut against The Jester in the opening bout; he not only lost the match but had to be carried out of the ring on a stretcher. Hoffman had previously covered the promotion during the mid-1990s and would continue to make occasional appearances over the next few years donating his prize money to charities. The journalist was signed to a series of Texas Death-style matches, with no referee present and "anything goes", against The Jester. These matches were held at the Silverwings Ballroom in Brenham on February 13, the Civic Center in Diboll on March 5, the Humble Bingo Arena on March 6, in Port Lavaca on March 13 and at Spring High School in Spring, Texas on March 20, 1999. Miss Hooters Girl 1999 winner Alisa Wong was his valet for these matches.

That summer, the promotion began producing a weekly late-night series which aired on KNWS-TV. Hoffman also made a return at the "Rumble in Humble" where he unexpectedly won the TASW Cruiserweight Championship in a Three-Way Dance with Bones and "Loverboy" Joey Corman. He was helped in his victory due to outside interference from Alisa Wong and his manager Sean "The Cablinasian" Pendergast. Hoffman also entered the "Humble Rumble", a 20-man battle royale for $15,000 and a title shot against then TASW Heavyweight Champion "Mean" Mike Tatum, but quickly eliminated himself after entering the ring. He retained the title in a rematch with Bones on February 12 and successfully defended the title for six months against opponents such as Brother Icarus, Bonez and the Jester until finally surrendering the title to TASW promoter Bob Murphy that summer.

=== 21st century ===
By 2000, TASW was regularly drawing between 300 and 800 fans each month at its home arena in Humble and also promoted shows in other cities outside Harris County and Houston including Texas City, Baytown, Port Lavaca, Brenham and El Campo. In August of that year, a story on Murphy and TASW was featured in the Houston Press and profiled several its top stars including female wrestlers Skyler and Nadia Payne, Big Daddy from Cincinnati, Mini Stuff, Mr. Fu Ku, Spanish Fly, "Playboy" Joey Corman, Rasta Savage, Necro Butcher and Shawn Hernandez. The story received a positive response from readers, however, Warriors of Wrestling (World of Wrestling) promoter wrote a letter to the editor criticizing the article for its "lack of research and professionalism" as well as the TASW for its inappropriate fan behavior. She requested the newspaper provide "equal exposure" and invited the author, Jesse Washington, to attend an upcoming show.

A year later, "Hacksaw" Jim Duggan wrestled for the promotion during the summer and early fall of 2001. During this first stint with TASW, Duggan feuded Harlem Heat 2000 (Big T and Stevie Ray) from World Championship Wrestling. Kamala and Mike Tatum headlined a TASW show at the Humble Bingo Arena on February 22, 2003. Later that year, the promotion held a memorial show for one of its former stars and official announcer, Brother Icarus, at the arena on October 4, 2003. Ken Hoffman, who had wrestled him two years before, wrote a column in memory of his passing. He recalled in a later column that during the match he secretly had Jim Adler, a celebrity TV attorney known as the "Tough Texas Lawyer", interfere in the match on his behalf. He ordered Brother Icarus to stop attacking Hoffman, who had been choking him and pulling his hair, and threatened to have Icarus arrested for assault and battery. When fans began booing, Adler threatened to subpoena the entire audience as witnesses. This distraction allowed Hoffman to roll-up his opponent for the victory and quickly escaped with the belt.

The promotion was praised by The Galveston County Daily News, the oldest newspaper of record in the state of Texas, as "the best-run independent group in the state" and crediting Bob Murphy for keeping TASW out of the well-publicized feuding seen among rival Texas promotions. Scott E. Williams, a journalist for The Galveston County Daily News, wrote in early-2004 that TASW was "arguably the top independent wrestling group in the entire state". On January 10, 2004, several TASW wrestlers participated in a show for High Impact Wrestling at Texas City’s Nessler Center headlined by Johnny Blade and Kamala. The event also served as the professional wrestling debut of Scott E. Williams who agreed to participate as the special guest referee in the main event in exchange for a donation to The Daily News’ United Way fund. On June 5, Tom Prichard, the top talent scout for World Wrestling Entertainment, conducted a "no-holds-barred" clinic at TASW's wrestling school in Humble. Also that summer, Jim Duggan returned to the promotion and, at the August 7th "Tomball Streetfight" supercard, defeated TASW Heavyweight Champion Zen-Zen for the title. At the time of its 11th anniversary at the 2005 "Humble Rumble", Williams wrote "In addition to being one of the country’s longest-lived independents, TASW has become the best one in Texas".

=== Recent years ===
On May 20, 2007, the promotion had its first card at the Armadillo Event Center where it held a 10-man "Hardcore Street Fight" inside a steel cage as the main event. The promotion and its school was again featured in the Houston Chronicle three months later. Scoby Gober, a three-time TASW Hardcore Champion, was interviewed for the story. On October 13, Ken Hoffman also made a return appearance as TASW's "SlamFest '07" supercard where he and Sean Pendergast won the TASW Tag Team Championship from Scoby Gober & Bones in a Triple Threat match with Nate Slater & Rocco Carmanooch at the Humble Bingo Arena. Like his previous victory, Hoffman was helped by valet Alisa Wong and manager Sheik Ali Ramzanali. Both men donated their prize money to charity. On December 8, 2007, Tammy Lynn Sytch made an appearance at the "Seasons Beatings" supercard at the Humble Bingo Arena. That same month, The Houston Press covered a TASW event at the Armadillo Events Center featuring Spider Boy, whom the author referred to as "the world's laziest Spider-Man", in a match with Steve "Bones" Monckton.

In February 2008, the Houston Chronicle also covered the Texas All-Star Wrestling's 15th-annual "Humble Rumble" where a photo was taken of "BLT" Bubba Lee Travis and an 8-year-old child attending the event with his father. The event boasted a sold-out crowd and was one of the promotion's biggest show of the new year. The following month at "Scar Wars", Daivari who was originally there for an autograph signing but was later involved in an altercation with Dylan Starr which led to impromptu match between the two. Later that night, he became involved in a post-match brawl after Starr interfered in a Triple Threat match between Hector Montoya, Nasty Nick Daniels and TASW Cruiserweight Champion Chip Dumas causing a no-contest.

The promotion celebrated its 16th anniversary at the 2009 "Humble Rumble" at the Humble Bingo Arena on January 10, 2009. At the end of the year, TexasIndyWrestling.com ranked Texas All-Star Wrestling #5 of the top ten wrestling promotions in Texas.

== TASW Heavyweight Championship ==
TASW Heavyweight Championship

Details
- Promotion: Texas All-Star Wrestling
- Date established: November 18, 1995
- Current champion: Zarek Camacho
- Date won: April 15, 2023
Statistics
- First champion: Humungous
- Most reigns: Mr. Mayhem, Humongous, ZenZen & Steve Demarco (3 times)
- Longest reign: ZenZen (735 days)
- Shortest reign: Steve DeMarco (<1 Day)
- Youngest champion: Bret Basics

The TASW Heavyweight Championship is a professional wrestling heavyweight championship in Texas All-Star Wrestling. It is the main championship title established in TASW, having been introduced in 1995, and remains the oldest active championship in the state of Texas.

The inaugural champion was Humungous (Bob Murphy), who defeated Dynamite Dixon in a tournament final on November 18, 1995 to become the first TASW Heavyweight Champion. Mr. Mayhem holds the record for most reigns, with three. He also holds the distinction of being the only champion never to have been pinned for the title. At 735 days, ZenZen's second reign is the longest in the title's history. Steve Demarco's second reign was the shortest in the history of the title as he lost it minutes after he won it. Bret Basics was the youngest wrestler ever to hold the title. Overall, there have been 42 reigns shared between 31 wrestlers, with eight vacancies.

Key

Reign	The reign number for the specific set of wrestlers listed
#	Indicates what number the reign is
Event	The event promoted by the respective promotion in which the titles were won
N/A	The information is not available or is unknown
—	Used for vacated reigns so as not to count it as an official reign
+	Indicates the current reign is changing daily.

#	Champion	Reign	Date	Days held	Location	Event	Notes	Ref.
1	Humungous	1	November 18, 1995	153	Harlingen, Texas	N/A	Defeated Dynamite Dixon in a tournament final to become the first TASW Heavyweight Champion.	
2	The Gladiator	1	April 19, 1996	120	Nacogdoches, Texas	N/A		
3	Bubba Monroe	1	August 17, 1996	N/A	Humble, Texas	N/A		
—	Vacated	—	September 1996	—	N/A	N/A	The title was vacated when Bubba Monroe left the promotion.	
4	Humungous	2	September 25, 1996	437	Laredo, Texas	N/A	Defeated The Gladiator to win the vacant title.	
5	Rasta Savage	1	December 6, 1997	217	Humble, Texas	N/A		
6	Tank Tyler	1	July 11, 1998	238	Humble, Texas	N/A		
7	Humungous	3	March 6, 1999	N/A	Humble, Texas	N/A		
8	Mike Tatum	1	1999	N/A	N/A	N/A		
9	Hotstuff Hernandez	1	2000	N/A	N/A	N/A		
10	Necro Butcher	1	2001	N/A	N/A	N/A		
—	Vacated	—	June 2001	—	N/A	N/A		
11	Mr. Mayhem	1	June 16, 2001	168	Humble, Texas	N/A	Defeated Beast in a tournament final to win the vacant title.	
12	Mike Tatum	2	December 1, 2001	126	Humble, Texas	Season's Beatings (2002)	This was a Steel Cage match.	
13	Bobby 2-Badd	1	April 6, 2002	161	Humble, Texas	Wrestlefest (2002)	This was a Triple Threat match also involving Jag.	
14	Mr. Mayhem	2	September 14, 2002	136	Humble, Texas	Off the Hook (2002)	This was a "Rage in the Cage" match also involving Hugh Rogue and Shawn "Hot Stuff" Hernandez.	
—	Vacated	—	January 18, 2003	—	Humble, Texas	Humble Rumble X	The title was vacated when Mr. Mayhem is unable to appear for a scheduled title defense due to Fort Hood being placed on alert.	
15	Bobby 2-Badd	1	January 18, 2003	77	Humble, Texas	Humble Rumble X	Won the 30-man Humble Rumble last eliminating Jag.	
16	Michael Strider	1	April 5, 2003	133	Humble, Texas	Wrestlefest (2003)		
17	"Wildman" Chris Allen	1	August 16, 2003	217	Humble, Texas	Humble Street Fight (2003)	This was a Triple Threat match also involving Bubba Lee Travis.	
18	Bret Basics	1	March 20, 2004	N/A	Humble, Texas	Scar Wars (2004)		
—	Held up	—	2004	—	N/A	N/A		
19	ZenZen	1	May 15, 2004	84	Humble, Texas	Break It Off (2004)	Defeated Bobby 2-Badd, Mr. Mayhem, and VooDoo the Xecutioner in a Fatal Four-Way match to win the held-up title.	
20	"Hacksaw" Jim Duggan	1	August 7, 2004	105	Tomball, Texas	Tomball Street Fight (2004)	This was a 12-man street fight also involving "Wildman" Chris Allen, Voodoo the Xecutioner, Nark The Nevulon, Bobby 2-Badd, Justin Blaze, Bubba Lee Travis, J-Sin Sullivan, "Wildcat" Scoby Gober, "Party Boy" Brandon Biggs, and Rocco Carmanooch	
21	Mr. Mayhem	3	November 20, 2004	238	Humble, Texas	Night of Champions (2004)	This was a Triple Threat match also involving Bobby 2-Badd. Also won the TASW Hardcore Championship on January 15, 2005.	
22	Voodoo the Xecutioner	1	July 16, 2005	182	Humble, Texas	Summer Jam (2005)	This was a Steel Cage match.	
23	ZenZen	2	January 14, 2006	735	Humble, Texas	Humble Rumble XIV	This was a Tables match.	
24	Scoby Gober	1	January 19, 2008	84	Humble, Texas	Humble Rumble XV	This was a "Title vs. Career" match.	
25	Anthony Stevens	1	April 12, 2008	119	Humble, Texas	Wrestlefest (2008)	This was a Lumberjack match.	
—	Vacated	—	August 9, 2008	—	Humble, Texas	Hardcore Carnage (2008)	The title was vacated after TASW promoter Bob Murphy fired Anthony Stevens.	
26	Neico	2	September 13, 2008	182	Humble, Texas	Slamfest (2008)	Defeated Nick Daniels in a tournament final.	
27	Ryan Davidson	1	March 14, 2009	308	Humble, Texas	Scar Wars (2009)	This was a Fatal Four-Way Steel Cage match also involving Nick Daniels and “Sexy” Steve DeMarco.	
28	Nick Daniels	1	January 16, 2010	170	Humble, Texas	Humble Rumble XVII		
—	Held up	—	July 5, 2010	—	N/A	N/A		
29	Dylan Starr	1	July 10, 2010	289	Humble, Texas	Summer Jam (2010)	Defeated “Rockstar” Robbie to win the vacant title. Both men were co-winners of a battle royal earlier that night.	
30	ZenZen	3	May 21, 2011	289	Nacogdoches, Texas	Rumble Mania (2011)		
—	Held up	—	July 11, 2011	—	N/A	N/A	Title declared vacant when ZenZen is unable to appear.	
31	Mysterious Q	1	July 23, 2011	252	Brenham, Texas	Brenham Rumble (2011)	This was a Triple Threat match also involving "Ruthless" Ryan Davidson and "Rockstar" Robbie.	
32	Steve DeMarco	1	March 31, 2012	547	Humble, Texas	Humble Rumble XIX		
33	Darkstar	1	September 29, 2013	406	Houston, Texas	Best of the Best (2013)		
34	El Latino	1	November 9, 2014	139	San Antonio, Texas	Raza Lucha Latina		
35	Anthony Andrews	1	March 28, 2015	364	Humble, Texas	Humble Rumble XXII	This was a Fatal Four-Way match also involving Hector Montoya and Mr. Bigg.	
36	J-Sin Sullivan	1	March 26, 2016	35	Humble, Texas	"Humble Rumble XXlll"		
—	Vacated	—	April 30, 2016	—	N/A	N/A	Title declared vacant when J_Sin Sullivan is unable to defend due to injuries sustain in attack backstage by Anthony Andrews and Nate Andrews.	
37	Big Daddy Yum Yum	1	April 30, 2016	700	Cypress, Texas	Stars & Stripes	Fatal 5-Way Elimination Match	
38	Steve DeMarco	2	March 31, 2018	0	Humble, Texas	"HUMBLE RUMBLE 25"	This was a "Triple Threat No Disqualification Match" also involving ZenZen.	
39	Estrella Galactica	1	March 31, 2018	252	Humble, Texas	"HUMBLE RUMBLE 25"	DeMarco issued an open challenge to the first person that stepped into the ring with him for his championship.	
40	Nate Andrews	1	Dec 8, 2018	98	Brownwood, TX	"BATTLE for the BELT"	"Best 2-out-of-3 Falls" Match	
41	Estrella Galactica	2	March 23, 2019	126	Cypress, TX	"SCAR WARS"	Mask vs Title Match	
42	Steve DeMarco	3	July 27, 2019	609	Cypress, TX	"SUMMER JAM"		
43	Nate Slater	1	March 27, 2021	189	Cypress, TX			
44	Angel Camacho	1	October 2, 2021	154	Cypress, TX			
45	Nate Slater	2	March 5, 2022	189	Cypress, TX	"SCAR WARS"		
46	Zarek Camacho	1	September 10, 2022	217	Cypress, TX			
47	Nate Bradley	1	April 15, 2023	1,142+	Cypress, TX			

== TASW Cruiserweight Championship ==
TASW Cruiserweight Championship

Details
- Promotion: Texas All-Star Wrestling
- Date established: December 22, 1994
- Current champion: Stevie Hendrix
- Date won: February 29, 2020
Statistics
- First champion: Rico Suave
- Most reigns: Witchita Willie (3) & Estrella Galactica (3)
- Longest reign: Estrella Galactica (427 days)
- Shortest reign: Jag (20 days)

The TASW Cruiserweight Championship is a professional wrestling championship in Texas All-Star Wrestling. It is the main cruiserweight championship title established in TASW, having been introduced in 1994, and remains the oldest active championship in the state of Texas.

The inaugural champion was Rico Suave, who defeated Witchita Willie in a tournament final on December 22, 1994 to become the first TASW Cruiserweight Champion. Willie also holds the record for most reigns, with three. Ken Hoffman, a reporter for the Houston Chronicle is a former champion and donated his prize money to charity. He successfully defended the title for six months before surrendering the belt to promoter Bob Murphy. At 427 days, Estrella Galactica's third reign is the longest in the title's history. Thunder Jet's first and only reign was the shortest in the history of the title being stripped of the belt only 7 days after winning the title. Overall, there have been 50 reigns shared between 38 wrestlers, with eight vacancies.

Key

Reign	The reign number for the specific set of wrestlers listed
#	Indicates what number the reign is
Event	The event promoted by the respective promotion in which the titles were won
N/A	The information is not available or is unknown
—	Used for vacated reigns so as not to count it as an official reign
+	Indicates the current reign is changing daily.

#	Champion	Reign	Date	Days held	Location	Event	Notes	Ref.
1	Rico Suave	1	December 22, 1994	422	Houston, Texas	House show	Defeated Witchita Willie in a tournament final to become the first TASW Cruiserweight Champion.	
2	The Shadow	1	February 17, 1996	294	Houston, Texas	House show		
—	Held up	—	December 7, 1996	—	N/A	N/A	The title was declared held up following a title defence against Witchita Willie in which Johnny Blade attacked Willie, took his place in the match, and pinned The Shadow for the belt.	
3	Witchita Willie	1	February 1, 1997	133	N/A	N/A	Defeated The Shadow and Rick Garren (substituting for the suspended Johnny Blade) in a Triangle match to win the vacant championship.	
4	The Jester	1	June 14, 1997	150	Humble, Texas	House show		
5	Witchita Willie	2	November 11, 1997	144	Humble, Texas	House show		
6	Jag	1	April 4, 1998	20	Humble, Texas	House show		
—	Vacated	—	April 24, 1998	—	Texas City, Texas	House show	Jag is stripped of the championship when he fails to appear for a scheduled title defence.	
7	Steve Lawless	1	April 24, 1998	N/A	Texas City, Texas	House show	Defeated Witchita Willie to win the vacant championship.	
—	Vacated	—	July 1998	—	N/A	N/A	Lawless is stripped of the championship when he fails to appear for a scheduled title defence.	
8	Witchita Willie	3	July 19, 1998	N/A	El Campo, Texas	House show	Defeated Mr. X to win the vacant championship.	
9	Jag	1	N/A	N/A	N/A	N/A		
10	Torry Fortune	1	October 23, 1999	84	Humble, Texas	House show	Defeated Bruce Leroy	
11	Ken Hoffman	1	January 15, 2000	N/A	Humble, Texas	Humble Rumble 2000	Defeated Bones and Loverboy Joey Corman in a Three Way Dance match. Hoffman was a reporter for the Houston Chronicle and donated his prize money to charity.	
—	Vacated	—	June 2000	—	N/A	N/A	The title is declared vacant when Hoffman surrenders the title to TASW owner Bob Murphy.	
12	Joey Corman	1	October 7, 2000	N/A		Night of Champions (2000)	Defeated Mini-Stuff in a tournament final to win the vacant title.	
13	Mercury	1	February 2002	N/A	N/A	N/A		
—	Vacated	—	July 2002	—	N/A	N/A		
14	Chris Allen	1	August 10, 2002	161	Humble, Texas	Humble Street Fight (2002)	Defeated Bret Basics in a tournament final.	
15	Bret Basics	1	January 18, 2003	112	Humble, Texas	Humble Rumble X	This was a Three Way match also involving Nark the Nevulon.	
16	General Agony	1	May 10, 2003	70	Weimer, Texas	House show		
17	Bret Basics	2	July 19, 2003	77	Humble, Texas	Summer Jam (2003)	This was a Steel Cage Loser Leaves TASW match.	
18	VooDoo the Xecutioner	1	October 4, 2003	168	Humble, Texas	Slamfest (2003)		
19	Joey Wise	1	March 20, 2004	28	Humble, Texas	Scar Wars (2004)		
20	VooDoo the Xecutioner	2	April 17, 2004	119	N/A	N/A		
21	Nark the Nevulon	1	August 14, 2004	154	Humble, Texas	Humble Street Fight (2004)		
22	Justin Blaze	1	January 15, 2005	245	Humble, Texas	Humble Rumble XII	This was a Six-Way match also involving Dylan Starr, Spector, Tony Montana, and Chico Torres.	
23	Chris Allen	1	September 17, 2005	49	Humble, Texas			
24	Justin Blaze	2	November 5, 2005	70	Humble, Texas			
25	Dylan Starr	1	January 14, 2006	294	Humble, Texas	Humble Rumble 14	This was an Assault Gauntlet match also including Brandon Biggs and Chip Dumas.	
26	Justin Blaze	2	November 4, 2006	139	Humble, Texas			
27	Riley Burke	1	March 23, 2007	106	Deer Park, Texas			
—	Vacated	—	July 7, 2007	—	Humble, Texas	Summer Jam (2007)	Riley Burke was stripped by TASW official T.S. Pierce after putting referee Ray Jay Johnson in a chokehold and the title is vacated.	
28	Chip Dumas	1	November 17, 2007	420	Humble, Texas	Night of Champions (2007)	Defeated Nasty Nick Daniels in a tournament final to win the vacant title.	
29	Hector Montoya	1	January 10, 2009	182	Humble, Texas	Humble Rumble 16	This was a Four-Way Gauntlet match also involving Riley Burke and Alex Evans.	
30	Dylan Starr	1	July 11, 2009	189	Humble, Texas	RAGE in the CAGE (2009)		
31	Alex Evans	1	January 16, 2010	140	Humble, Texas	Humble Rumble		
32	Billy Bongo	1	June 5, 2010	N/A	Humble, Texas	Beat Down (2010)	This was a Triple Threat Match also involving Hector Montoya	
—	Vacated	—	2011	—	N/A	N/A		
33	Amien Rios	1	March 5, 2011	91	Humble, Texas	Humble Rumble 18	Defeated Leon Magico to win the vacant title.	
34	Mysterious Q	1	June 4,2011	35	Houston, Texas	Feel the Heat (2011)	Triple Threat Match	
35	Amien Rios	2	July 9, 2011	266	Houston, Texas	Summer Jam (2011)	This was a Mexican Death match.	
36	Rockstar Robbie	1	March 31, 2012	364	Humble, Texas	Humble Rumble 19		
37	Gustavo Mendoza	1	March 30, 2013	274	Humble, Texas	Humble Rumble 20		
38	Bryan Keith	1	December 29, 2013	83	Houston, Texas	Ruthless Fury (2013)	This was a Triple Threat match also involving Thunder Jet.	
39	Thunder Jet	1	March 22, 2014	7	Houston, Texas	NEW ERA		
—	Vacated	—	March 29, 2014	—	N/A	N/A		
40	Estrella Galactica	1	March 29, 2014	112	Humble, Texas	Humble Rumble 21	Defeated Bryan Keith after Thunder Jet failed to show up in time. Thunder Jet arrived immediately following the match, unsuccessfully challenging Galactica for the title.	
41	Haywire	1	July 19, 2014	98	Humble, Texas	RAGE in the CAGE (2014)		
42	Estrella Galactica	2	October 25, 2014	211	Houston, Texas	SCAR WARS (2014)	Ladder Match	
43	Haywire	2	May 24, 2015	307	San Antonio, Texas		Ladder Match	
44	Nate Andrews	1	March 26, 2016	217	Humble, Texas	Humble Rumble 23	Fatal 4-Way Match also involving Smoke the Reaper and Estrella Galactica	
45	Estrella Galactica	3	October 29, 2016	427	Cypress, Texas	Halloween Horror (2016)	30-Minute Iron Man Match (4 Falls - 3 Falls)	
46	Rosko	1	December 30, 2017	140	Cypress, TX	CRISIS in CYPRESS (2017)	Triple Threat Match also involving "HBQ"	
47	Steve Demarco	1	May 19, 2018	252	Cypress, TX	CYPRESS RUMBLE (2018)		
48	Rosko	2	January 26, 2019	182	Cypress, TX	BEST of the BEST (2019)		
49	Nate Andrews	2	July 27, 2019	217	Cypress, TX	SUMMER JAM (2019)		
50	Stevie Hendrix	1	February 29, 2020	2,283+	Cypress, TX	BEST of the BEST (2020)		

== TASW Tag Team Championship ==
TASW Tag Team Championship

Details
- Promotion: Texas All-Star Wrestling
- Date established: December 7, 1996
- Current champions: Galactic Star Warriors (Estrella Galactica & Azteca Dorado)
- Date won: February 29, 2020
Statistics
- First champion: Natural Born Killers
- Longest reign: Pump Patrol (882 days)
- Shortest reign: Brutality Inc. (35 days)

The TASW Tag Team Championship is a professional wrestling tag team championship contested in Texas All-Star Wrestling (TASW). It was the third of four championship titles established in TASW, having been introduced in 1996, and remains the oldest active tag team championship in the state of Texas.

The inaugural champions were Natural Born Killers (Rico Suave and G.Q. Knight), who defeated Top Guns (Ace and Jag) on December 7, 1996 to become the first TASW Tag Team Champions. No team has ever won the championship more than once. Scoby Gober, however, has the most individual reigns with 3. At 882 days, The Pump Patrol's first and only reign is the longest in the title's history. Brutality Inc.'s (Ken Hoffman and Sean Pendergast) only reign was the shortest in the history of the title lasting only 35 days. Both men were reporters from the Houston Chronicle and donated their prize money to charity upon winning the title.

Key

Reign	The reign number for the specific set of wrestlers listed
#	Indicates what number the reign is
Event	The event promoted by the respective promotion in which the titles were won
N/A	The information is not available or is unknown
—	Used for vacated reigns so as not to count it as an official reign
+	Indicates the current reign is changing daily.

#	Wrestlers	Reigns	Date	Days held	Location	Event	Notes	Ref.
1	Natural Born Killers (Rico Suave and G.Q. Knight)	1	December 7, 1996	N/A	Humble, Texas	House show	Defeated Top Guns (Ace and Jag) to become the first TASW Tag Team Champions.	
—	Vacated	—	1997	—	N/A	N/A	Stripped when Suave is injured.	
2	Top Guns (Ace and Jag)	1	May 3, 1997	N/A	Humble, Texas	House show	Defeated Wardog and Rasta Savage to win the vacant championship.	
3	Top Gun Jag (2) and Tank Tyler	1	June 1997	N/A	Humble, Texas	House show	Top Gun Ace is replaced by Tank Tyler after leaving the promotion.	
4	The Hellhounds (Wardog and Maddog)	1	June 14, 1997	314	Humble, Texas	House show	The Hellhounds won the championship due to forfeit.	
5	New Breed (Johnny Blade and Iron Mike)	1	April 24, 1998	84	Texas City, Texas	House show	New Breed defeated Maddog in a handicap match when Wardog failed to appear at the event.	
6	Humungous and Bruiser Bennett	1	July 17, 1998	182	Diboll, Texas	House show		
—	Vacated	—	January 15, 1999	—	N/A	N/A		
7	The Terminator and Rasta Savage	1	February 6, 1999	N/A	Humble, Texas	House show	Defeated Jason Nash and Sid Sexy in a tournament final.	
8	Big Daddy and Chris Cheetum	1	2000	N/A	N/A	House show		
9	Ministuff and Hotstuff Hernandez	1	2000	N/A	N/A	House show		
10	Big Daddy (2) and The Spanish Fly	1	2000	N/A	N/A	House show		
11	Ministuff (2) and Skyler	1	2001	N/A	N/A	House show		
12	Bobby 2-Badd and Seth Shai	1	July 7, 2001	742	Humble, Texas	House show	Defeated Ministuff and Sid Sexy.	
13	The Brooklyn Boys (Tony Montana and Rocco Carmanooch)	1	July 19, 2003	392	Humble, Texas	Summer Jam (2003)	This was a Three Way Tag Team Steel Cage match also involving Zen Zen & Hugh Rogue. Shai cost the team the match when he slammed the cage door on his partner. On January 10, 2004, the team wrestled High Impact Wrestling Tag Team Champions The Outlawz in a unification match.	
14	Bobby 2-Badd (2) and Mr. Mayhem	1	August 14, 2004	97	Humble, Texas	House show		
15	ZenZen and Chris Allen	1	November 19, 2004	N/A	New Caney, Texas	House show		
16	Scoby Gober and Bubba Lee Travis	1	2005	N/A	N/A	House show		
17	Nate Slater and Nick Daniels	1	2005	N/A	N/A	House show		
18	Nark the Nevulon and VooDoo the Xecutioner	1	July 8, 2006	179	Humble, Texas	Summer Jam (2006)		
19	Wally and Stumpy Gimp (The Gimps)	1	January 13, 2007	49	Humble, Texas	Humble Rumble XIV	This was a Fatal Fourway match.	
20	Dylan Starr and Nick Daniels (2)	1	March 3, 2007	126	Humble, Texas	Scar Wars (2007)	This was a Three Way Tag Scramble match also involving Rocco Carmanooch and Chip Dumas.	
21	Scoby Gober (2) and Bones	1	July 7, 2007	98	Humble, Texas	Summer Jam (2007)	Defeated Dylan Starr and Stumpy Gimp. Scoby Gober's original partner, T-Bone, was also unable to attend the show and replaced by Bones.	
22	Brutality Inc. (Ken Hoffman and Sean Pendergast)	1	October 13, 2007	35	Humble, Texas	Slamfest (2007)	This was a Triple Threat match also involving Nate Slater and Rocco Carmanooch. Hoffman and Pendergast claimed they would donate their prize money to charity.	
23	Parental Discretion Advised (Nate Slater (2) and Rocco Carmanooch (2))	1	November 17, 2007	N/A	Humble, Texas	Night of Champions (2007)		
—	Held up	—	January 2009	—	N/A	N/A		
24	ZenZen (2) and Scoby Gober (3)	1	April 11, 2009	N/A	Humble, Texas	Wrestlefest (2009)	Defeated in a tournament final to win the vacant titles.	
—	Vacated	—	2010	—	N/A	N/A		
25	Hector Montoya and Mysterious Q	1	July 10, 2010	368	Humble, Texas	House show	Defeated “Ruthless” Ryan Davidson and Billy Bongo in a tournament final.	
—	Vacated	—	July 11, 2011	—	N/A	N/A	Stripped when Hector Montoya left the promotion.	
26	Ryan Davidson and Rockstar Robbie	1	July 23, 2011	813	Brenham, Texas	Brenham Rumble (2011)	Awarded the championship after winning a 10-man battle royal.	
27	Rockstar Robbie (2)	1	October 13, 2013	41	Houston, Texas	Gold Rush (2013)	Defeated Ryan Davidson in a "winner-take-all" match after the team broke up.	
28	Ryan Davidson (2) and Ayden Cristiano	1	November 23, 2013	126	La Porte, Texas	Brawl in the Fall (2013)	Defeated Rockstar Robbie and mystery partner J-Sin Sullivan.	
29	Southern Outlaw Boys (Roc Hardway and Jesse Logan)	1	March 29, 2014	205	Humble, Texas	Humble Rumble XXI		
—	Held up	—	October 20, 2014	—	N/A	N/A	The titles are declared held up when Roc Hardway went into retirement.	
30	Southern Outlaw Boys (Jesse Logan and Justin Walker)	1	October 25, 2014	154	Houston, Texas	Scar Wars		
31	The 409'ers (Onyx Cooper and Nate Laws)	1	March 28, 2015	329	Humble, Texas	Humble Rumble XXII		
32	The Andrews Cousins (Anthony Andrews and Nate Andrews)	1	February 20, 2016	371	Houston, Texas	Beat Down (2016)	Triple Threat Match Also involving the team of J_Sin Sullivan & Estrella Galactica	
33	The Pump Patrol (Jared Wayne, Curt Mathews, and Jonny Flex)	1	February 25, 2017	882	Cypress, Texas	Beat Down (2017)		
34	The Great Ones (Gordon & Gregory Great)	1	July 27, 2019	217	Cypress, TX	SUMMER JAM (2019)		
35	Galactic Star Warriors (Estrella Galactica & Azteca Dorado)	1	February 29, 2020	2,283+	Cypress, TX	BEST of the BEST (2020)	Triple Threat Match also involving Fly Def.	

== TASW Women's Championship ==
TASW Women's Championship

Details
- Promotion: Texas All-Star Wrestling
- Date established: September 7, 2019
- Current champion: Killa Kate
- Date won: September 7, 2019
Statistics
- First champion: Killa Kate
- Longest reign: Killa Kate (Current)

The TASW Women's Championship is a professional wrestling tag team championship contested in Texas All-Star Wrestling (TASW). It was introduced in 2019.

The inaugural champion was Killa Kate, who defeated Phoebe & Livi Loca on September 7, 2019 to become the first TASW Women's Champion. Currently she is the only person to have held the championship.

Key

Reign	The reign number for the specific set of wrestlers listed
#	Indicates what number the reign is
Event	The event promoted by the respective promotion in which the titles were won
N/A	The information is not available or is unknown
—	Used for vacated reigns so as not to count it as an official reign
+	Indicates the current reign is changing daily.

#	Wrestlers	Reigns	Date	Days held	Location	Event	Notes	Ref.
1	Killa Kate	1	September 7, 2019	2,458+	Cypress, TX	BREAK it OFF (2019)	Triple Threat Elimination Match also involving Phoebe & Livi loca to crown the first ever TASW Women's Champion.	
