= Tugboat Taylor =

American wrestler (1945-2017)

Personal information
- Born: Dickie Taylor; December 9, 1945 Maquoketa, Iowa, U.S.
- Died: November 8, 2017 (aged 71) Houston, Texas, U.S.

Professional wrestling career
- Ring name(s): Tugboat Taylor; Tug Taylor; Ciclope
- Billed height: 6"2
- Billed weight: 396 lb (180 kg)
- Trained by: Johnny Valentine
- Debut: 1979
- Retired: 1997

Dickie Dean Taylor (December 9, 1945 – November 8, 2017) was an American professional wrestler who was best known as Tugboat Taylor in the Global Wrestling Federation in Texas.

== Early career ==
Taylor started in the Marine Corps in 1964 and fought in the Vietnam War. He was discharged in 1968 and moved back to Clinton, Iowa as a lab technician. He coached the Marine Corp and Navy Wrestling and Boxing Teams at Treasure lsland in San Francisco. In 1972, he was supposed to be in the Olympics as a power-lifter.

== Professional wrestling career ==
In 1979, he was trained by Johnny Valentine and made his debut that year. He worked for Mid-South Wrestling for a few years in the early 1980s, Central States Wrestling and Texas All-Star Wrestling.

In the late 1980s, he worked for World Class Championship Wrestling and Mid-Atlantic Championship Wrestling which later became World Championship Wrestling (WCW) in November 1988.

In 1991, he made his debut for Global Wrestling Federation as Tug Taylor where he teamed with his son Chaz Taylor. They would feud with the Davis Brothers Mike and Tom in late 1991 and early 1992; and John Tatum (wrestler) and Rod Price in 1992. Taylor went to Japan to work for W*ING that year and Mexico as Ciclope. In 1993, he returned to Global and continued working in independent promotions in Texas.

== Personal life and death ==
After retiring from wrestling in 1997, Taylor opened his wrestling school in Houston called Tugboat's School for Professional Wrestling. His most notable student was Hernandez (wrestler).

Taylor and his wrestling school appeared in the Sports Illustrated June 15, 1998 issue with Michael Jordan on the cover.

He was the father of Global Wrestling Federation veteran Chaz Taylor.

Taylor died at 71 on November 8, 2017, in Houston.

== Championships and accomplishments ==
- American Wrestling Federation
  - AWF Heavyweight Championship
