= Bubba Monroe =

American professional wrestler

- Born: Quentin Gary Bell; October 23, 1960; Memphis, Tennessee, U.S.
- Died: September 10, 2022 (aged 61); Pineville, Louisiana, U.S.
- Occupations: Professional wrestler, promoter, trainer
- Relatives: Sputnik Monroe (father)
- Professional wrestling career
- Ring name(s): Bubba Monroe; The Cajun Brawler
- Billed height: 6 ft 2 in (1.88 m)
- Billed weight: 260 lb (120 kg)
- Billed from: New Orleans, Louisiana
- Trained by: Sputnik Monroe
- Debut: 1981
- Retired: 2000

Quentin Bell (October 23, 1960 – September 10, 2022), better known by his ring name Bubba Monroe, was an American professional wrestler and trainer who wrestled in numerous regional and independent promotions in the Southern United States during the 1980s and 1990s. Though his career did not reach the same heights of his father Sputnik Monroe, partially due to the decline of the National Wrestling Alliance, Monroe won several regional titles during his near 20-year career, most notably, the heavyweight championship for Texas All-Star Wrestling.

Like his father, Monroe too competed in the Memphis territory in late-1986 before moving on to the Global Wrestling Federation and Mark Von Erich's version of World Class Championship Wrestling. He also made brief appearances in World Championship Wrestling and the World Wrestling Federation. The end of the NWA territory system saw Monroe spend his final years working for various independent organizations in the Houston-area until his retirement in 2000. As of 2009, he continued to operate his own training facility, the "Too Bad School of Professional Wrestling", in Pineville, Louisiana.

== Career ==
=== Early years in Memphis ===
Born and raised in Tioga, Louisiana, Quentin Bell was the youngest of Sputnik Monroe's three children. He was trained primarily by his father and made his pro debut in 1981. Monroe began competing in Memphis territory, his father's old stomping ground, in the fall of 1986. With wins over William Thompson and Davey Haskins, he was "officially" introduced by the elder Monroe during a television interview at the Mid-South Coliseum on October 18, 1986; Monroe defeated Jim Jamison later on in the show with his father as his cornerman. The following week, he and Big Bubba defeated Excitement Inc. (Ric McCord & John Paul) when Monroe pinned John Paul.

On November 1, 1986, Monroe teamed with The Memphis Vice (Jerry Bryant & Lou Winston) in a 6-man tag team match against Jerry "The King" Lawler, The Giant Hillbilly and David Haskins. After Monroe was pinned by Haskins, in what was viewed as a controversial finish, his partners Bryant and Winston demanded the match continue as a two-out-of-three falls match. Their request was granted but turned into a 6-way brawl within a few minutes. Outside interference from Don Bass and Larry Wright would disqualify Monroe's team and, after Lawler hit Bass with a trash can, all five men fled back to the locker room. He challenged Jerry Lawler in a singles match on November 8, 1986, but was pinned in 22 seconds. This was his final appearance for the promotion. His brief time with the promotion may be explained by his inexperience at the time, especially while being pushed as a main eventer, as well as bookers promoting him as a "heel" despite his father being a longtime favorite in the area. Sputnik Monroe would continue to be involved in his career, occasionally joining him in father-son tag team matches, up until the late 1990s.

=== Tour of the East Coast independents ===
Monroe also had a brief stint on the East Coast independent circuit during the 1990s. In early-1991, he wrestled Sledgehammer McGill and Morgus the Maniac for promoter Lou Martin and the Mid-Atlantic Wrestling Association. He eventually won the promotion's heavyweight championship following a battle royal which he won after eliminating Agony of The Lords of Darkness.

He also wrestled for the newly established Mid-Eastern Wrestling Federation where he again faced McGill as well as forming a brief alliance with The Lords of Darkness (Pain & Agony). On August 17, 1991, he joined them in a 6-man tag team match against "Surfer" Ray Odyssey, Chris Evans, and The Spider at an event for Larry Sharpe's World Wrestling Association in Blackwood, New Jersey; this match was featured on the first video release from the official video library of Sharpe's Monster Factory.

Also that summer, Monroe made his first television appearances for World Championship Wrestling and the World Wrestling Federation. He wrestled Dustin Rhodes on the August 24th edition of WCW Power Hour as well as earlier edition airing on WCW Worldwide. The following month, he faced Kerry von Erich on the September 7th edition of WWF Superstars and Million Dollar Champion Virgil on the September 22nd WWF Challenge.

Monroe returned to the MEWF at the end of the year where, on December 1, 1991, he agreed to help The Lords of Darkness defend the MEWF Tag Team Championship by taking the place of an injured Pain. He and Agony were unsuccessful in defeating their opponents, Cream Team (Dave Casanova and Rip Sawyer), losing the tag titles in Dundalk, Maryland that night.

=== Global Wrestling Federation ===
By 1992, Monroe had returned to the Southern United States. While working for Tugboat Taylor's Texas All-Pro Wrestling, he won the TAPW Light Heavyweight Championship from Wichita Willie in Pasadena, Texas, on August 28, 1992, and re-lost the title to him at the same event. Monroe would continue wrestling on the Texas "indy circuit", specifically in the Houston-area, for the rest of the decade.

Later that year, Monroe joined the Global Wrestling Federation where he had mixed success as a singles and tag team wrestler. He made his GWF debut on November 13, 1992, wrestling to a time-limit draw with Calvin Knapp and later defeating Tribal Nation (Brave Sky & Nocona) in a tag team match with Mike Davis; he also teamed with The Metal Maniac against Tribal Nation later that month. In singles competition, Monroe was able to defeat Rainbow Brown on November 20 but was disqualified in his match against GWF Television Champion Manny Villalobos at the Dallas Sportatorium a few weeks later.

Budget cutbacks resulted in the GWF dropping much of its talent and Monroe found work with Danny Davis' Associated Wrestlers of the Universe in Houston. He won the AWU Heavyweight Championship from American Warrior in Houston on July 31, 1993, and held the title until the promotion's close the next year. At an independent show held at Brazoswood High School on March 11, 1995, a bout between him and The Gladiator was part of the semi-main event in addition to a championship match between "Gentleman" Chris Adams and Iceman King Parsons.

=== Confederate Wrestling Alliance ===
Monroe returned to the Dallas Sportatorium with the Confederate Wrestling Alliance in the fall of 1995. On September 1, 1995, he lost to Action Jackson in one of his first matches for the promotion. He also formed tag teams with The Secret and Butch Malone, mostly in matches against Scott Putski & Konnan, wrestling under the name "Bubba Malone" with the latter. He and Butch Malone received a title shot against CWA Tag Team Champions Bo Vegas & Devon Michaels on December 15, 1995, but came up short.

During his second year with the promotion, Monroe wrestled in both the singles and tag team division. In April 1996, he and Dapper Dan fought to a time-limit draw while a rematch against Action Jackson ended in a no-contest. Forming a tag team with Dan, the two spent the next few months wrestling Action & Al Jackson, Sam Houston & Charlie Norris, and Bo Vegas & Devon Michaels. His last appearance was at a CWA television taping at the Sportatorium where he wrestled former tag team partner Mike Davis.

=== Final years on the Texas "indy circuit" ===
That same year, Monroe wrestled for Donny Valentine's Iron Fist Wrestling Federation. On January 11, 1996, he became the promotion's first heavyweight champion after eliminating Bullman Downs in a battle royal held in Dallas, Texas. He lost the belt to Tarzan Tyler in Baytown six months later. On May 15, 1998, he wrestled Texas independent wrestler The Gravedigger in his debut match in front of a 1,200–1,500 crowd in Alexandria, Louisiana. Monroe also spent time in Texas All-Star Wrestling and became one of its earliest champions when he won the TASW Heavyweight Championship from The Gladiator in Humble, Texas, on August 17, 1996. The title was vacated after he left the area in September 1996.

Although never competing for the original World Class Championship Wrestling under the Von Erich family, Monroe took part in the several revival attempts in the years following it close. The Global Wrestling Federation and the Confederate Wrestling Alliance were examples of these later efforts to bring wrestling back to the Sportatorium. In the late-1990s, Monroe joined Mark Von Erich's version of WCCW and participated in its shows to raise money for local charities. He later wrestled Von Erich for the WCCW Heavyweight Championship at Brazoswood High School on November 14, 1998. Elsewhere on the Texas independent circuit that month, Monroe wrestled Bill Dundee at the University of Houston's Hofheinz Pavilion.

In one of his last matches as an active wrestler, Monroe wrestled "Mr. USA" Tony Atlas for the United States Heavyweight Championship at "Slamfest 2000", a benefit show for Bridgewood Farms, at Houston's Montgomery County Fairgrounds.

== Recent years ==
A year or two later, Monroe retired from the sport to open his own training facility, the "Too Bad School of Professional Wrestling", in Pineville, Louisiana. He did, however, continue to make occasional appearances for local promoters. In November 2002, he made an appearance with fellow Global Wrestling Federation alumni Mark Von Erich, One Man Gang, and manager Skandor Akbar along with tag team partner and friend Dapper Dan at a Red River Wrestling show held at the Rapides Coliseum in Alexandria, Louisiana. Two years later, on February 7, 2004, he and his father were among those in attendance at Red Bastien's annual "Texas Shootout" luncheon in Arlington, Texas, along with other Texas wrestling legends including James Beard, Ivan and Scott Putski, Killer Tim Brooks, Ric Manning, Kit Carson, Tom Jones, Nick Kozak, Johnny Mantell, Tom Renesto Jr., Ken Ramey, Karl Kox, Khris Germany, Jackie Goldman, Silento Rodriguez, Tank Gilbert, Bill Colvils, Marc Lowrance, Doug Johnson, Nikla Roberts, Bullman Downs, Chico Caballo, Jason Kettner, Chris Morrow, Clifford Hory, Bill Mercer, Tadd Murphy, Fred Urban, Wallace Evans, Chris Youngblood, Jonah, and Robert Player.

Later years hadn't been good for Monroe as he had had many run-ins with the law with multiple drug charges and parole violations.

Bubba Monroe died on September 10, 2022, at the age of 61.

== Championships and accomplishments ==
- Associated Wrestlers of the Universe
  - AWU Heavyweight Championship (1 time, last)
- Atlantic States Wrestling Alliance / Mid-Atlantic Wrestling Alliance
  - MAWA Heavyweight Championship (1 time)
- Iron Fist Wrestling Federation
  - IFWF Heavyweight Championship (1 time, first)
- Pro Wrestling Illustrated
  - PWI ranked him #405 of the top 500 singles wrestlers in the PWI 500 in 1995
  - PWI ranked him #285 of the top 500 singles wrestlers in the PWI 500 in 1993
- Texas All-Pro Wrestling
  - TAPW Light Heavyweight Championship (1 time)
- Texas All-Star Wrestling
  - TASW Heavyweight Championship (1 time)
