= TeXML =

- Developer: Oleg A. Paraschenko
- Stable release: December 2010
- Written in: Python
- Operating system: Cross-platform
- Type: Typesetting
- License: MIT/X Consortium license
- Website: http://www.getfo.org/

TeXML [tɛχːml] is – as a process – a TeX-based alternative to XSL-FO.

TeXML has been developed as an open-source project with the aim to automatically present XML data as PDF with sophisticated layout properties.

By means of an auxiliary structure definition, TeXML overcomes the syntax-based differences between TeX and XML.

Technically, the markup elements of TeX are described by using the XML syntax.

== History ==
TeXML is a further development of a specification originally defined by Douglas Lovell at IBM, where Structure and Transformation have to be distinguished.

- Structure

The XML definition of the TeXML structure can be considered as being completed since 1999 (TeXML.dtd).

It represents the markup link between TeX and XML.

- Transformation

The transformation processes run smoothly since the end of 2010, a productive application of the technology is possible.

The original approach of using a Java application was published by IBM at IBM alphaWorks, but is no longer present. It was presented in a paper

at the 1999 annual meeting of the TeX Users Group.

== Application ==
TeXML is used to generate Technical Documentation from XML data.

After the transformation TeXML → TeX, the entire LaTeX-defined range of TeX macros is available.

By means of using TeX macros, it is possible to publish XML data having configurable layout options.

== Specials ==
- TeXML allows automatic publication of XML data by means of a typesetting engine, which was originally designed for manual typesetting.
- In contrast to publication using the XSL-FO technique layout properties of XML data can be manipulated by using exception rules in the intermediate code.
- Exception rules are learned by the publication process, the layout properties are thus enhanced with each generation cycle.
- High-speed publishing processes, an increase in speed of up to 100 times compared to XSL-FO based processes, especially in the case of large documents.

== TeXML structure ==
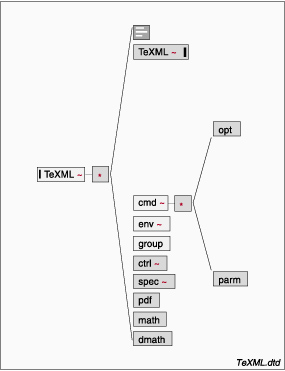

The Document Type Definition (DTD) of the TeXML structure consists of the XML elements:

- Root element: TeXML
- Encoding commands: cmd
- Encoding environments: env
- Encoding groups: group
- Encoding math groups: math and dmath
- Encoding control symbols: ctrl
- Encoding special symbols: spec
- PDF literals: pdf

== Composition of a TeXML document ==
An example of an XML document, which has already been transformed into the TeXML structure:

<TeXML>
<TeXML escape="0">
\documentclass[a4paper]{article}
\usepackage[latin1]{inputenc}
\usepackage[T1]{fontenc}
</TeXML>
<env name="document">
Misinterpretation of special characters as being functional characters is called "Escaping", thus: $, ^, >
</env>
</TeXML>

== TeXML process ==
The TeXML process transforms XML data which are described in the auxiliary intermediate TeXML structure to TeX:

\documentclass[a4paper]{article}
\usepackage[latin1]{inputenc}
\usepackage[T1]{fontenc}
\begin{document}
Misinterpretation of special characters as being functional characters is called "Escaping", thus: \textdollar{}, \^{},
\textgreater{}
\end{document}

== Supporting processes ==
Works on the "Data Collection Level" (XML) and on the "Publication Level" (TeX) are supported by different tools, for example:

- Data Collection Level: XML editors

– Eclipse (IDE), open source
– other free XML editors

- Publication Level: synchronization between code and generated PDF by means of pdfSync:

– Windows PC: editor MiKTeX
– Mac OS X: editor TeXShop

== Literature ==
- Frank Mittelbach The LaTeX Companion – Tools and techniques for computer typesetting
- Michel Goossens The XeTeX Companion – TeX meets OpenType and Unicode
