= Deutschsprachige Anwendervereinigung TeX =

German-language TeX users group

Logo DANTE e. V.

Deutschsprachige Anwendervereinigung TeX e.V., or DANTE e.V., is the German-language TeX users group.

With about 1800 members, it is the largest TeX users group worldwide. DANTE was founded on 14 April 1989 in the German city of Heidelberg by a handful of TeX enthusiasts who had met formerly on a non-regular basis. According to its statutes, DANTE consults TeX users from all German-speaking countries and funds TeX-related projects. It also represents members in discussions with other TeX users groups.

DANTE runs the main CTAN backbone server, dante.ctan.org. Conferences with talks, tutorials and general member meetings are held bi-annually on changing locations all over the German-speaking countries. The conferences are free of charge for everyone interested in TeX. The member journal, Die TeXnische Komödie (German, 'The TeXnical comedy', a pun on Dante's Divine Comedy referring back to the group's name), is published quarterly.

DANTE's international counterpart is the TeX Users Group (TUG) that was founded in 1980.
