= The PracTeX Journal =

- Discipline: digital typography
- Language: English

Publication details
- History: March 2005 – October 2012
- Publisher: TUG (USA)

Standard abbreviations
- ISO 4: PracTeX J.

Indexing
- ISSN: 1556-6994

Links
- Journal homepage

The PracTeX Journal, or simply PracTeX, also known as TPJ, was an online journal focussing on practical use of the TeX typesetting system. The first issue appeared in March 2005. It was published by the TeX Users Group and intended to be a complement to their primary print journal, TUGboat. The PracTeX Journal was last published in October 2012.

Topics covered in PracTeX included:

- publishing projects or activities accomplished through the use of TeX
- problems that were resolved through the use of TeX or problems with TeX that were resolved
- how to use certain LaTeX packages
- questions & answers
- introductions for beginners

The editorial board included many long-time and well-known TeX developers, including Lance Carnes, Arthur Ogawa, and Hans Hagen.
