= TUGboat =

- Discipline: Digital typography
- Language: various (usually English)

Publication details
- History: 1980 to present
- Publisher: TUG (USA)

Standard abbreviations
- ISO 4: TUGboat

Indexing
- ISSN: 0896-3207

Links
- Journal homepage

TUGboat (ISSN 0896-3207, DOI prefix 10.47397) is a journal published three times per year by the TeX Users Group. It covers a wide range of topics in digital typography relevant to the TeX typesetting system. The editor is Barbara Beeton.

== See also ==
- The PracTeX Journal
