= Hernandez (wrestler) =

American professional wrestler (born 1973)

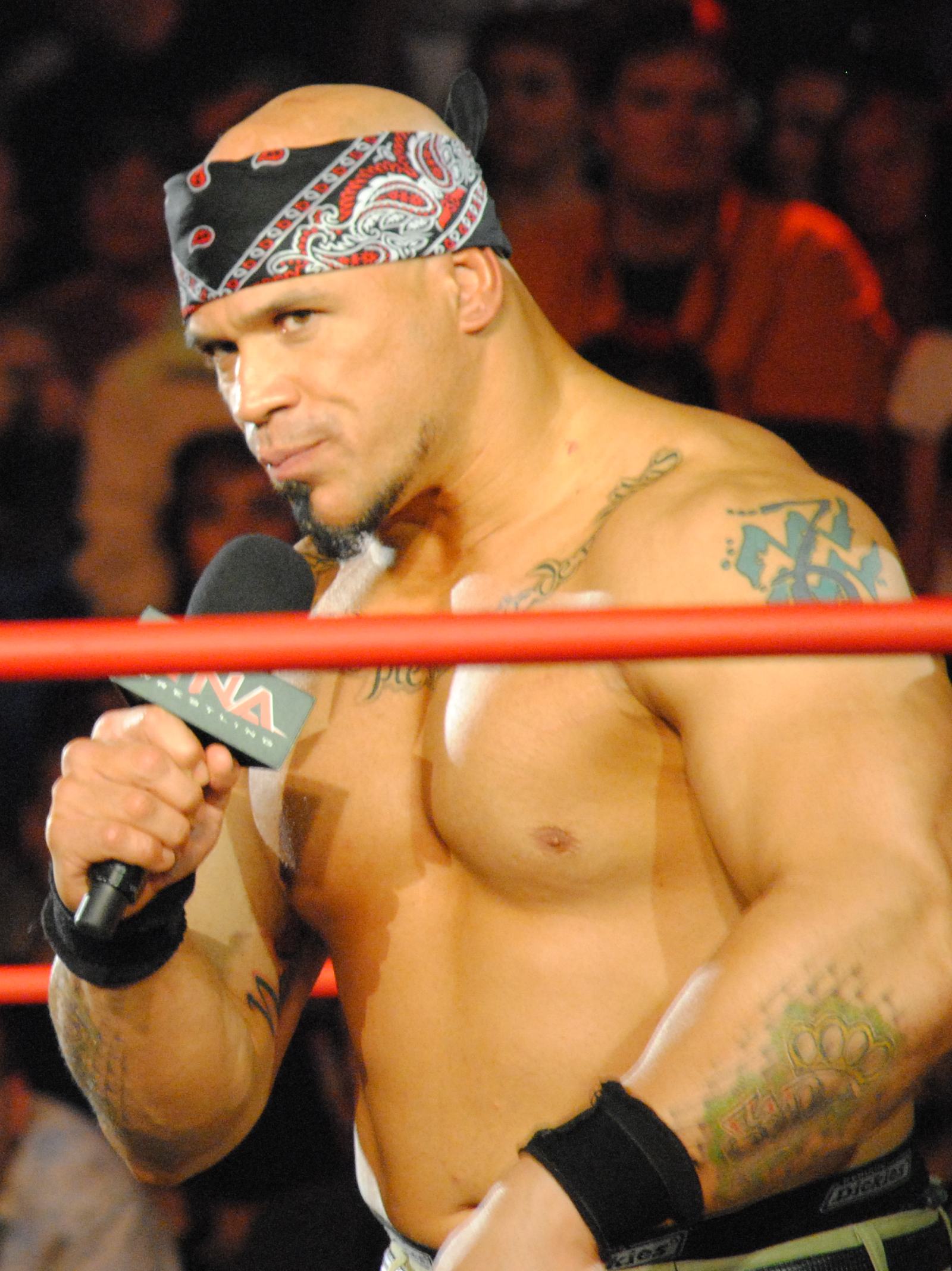
- Hernandez in 2011

Personal information
- Born: Shawn Hernandez; February 11, 1973 (age 53) Houston, Texas, U.S.
- Education: Texas A&M–Kingsville]
- Children: Alexandra Hernandez, Jaxon Hernandez

Professional wrestling career
- Ring name(s): Double Iron Sheik #2; Hernandez; Hotstuff Hernandez; Mr. Texas; Shawn Hernandez; The Masked Super Tex
- Billed height: 6 ft 2 in (188 cm)
- Billed weight: 285 lb (129 kg)
- Billed from: Houston, Texas
- Trained by: Tugboat Taylor

Shawn Hernandez (born February 11, 1973) is an American professional wrestler. He is best known for his time with Total Nonstop Action Wrestling (TNA), where he performed under the mononymous ring name Hernandez. He is an eight-time tag team champion, having won the TNA World Tag Team Championship five times, the NWA World Tag Team Championship twice and IWA World Tag Team Championship once. He is also performs on the independent circuit and co-promoter of the Houston, Texas-based promotion Latino Wrestling Entertainment (LWE).

== Early life ==
Hernandez played college football at Texas A&M–Kingsville. He briefly signed with the Texas Terror of the Arena Football League in March 1996 as a lineman but did not play in any games.

== Professional wrestling career ==
=== Early career (1996–2003) ===
Following the end of his football career, Hernandez trained under Tugboat Taylor and later under Rudy Boy Gonzalez in the Texas Wrestling Academy. He debuted in Texas All-Star Wrestling in November 1996.

In 2000 and 2001 Hernandez worked for the World Wrestling Federation as a jobber, appearing on episodes of WWF Jakked and in dark matches. He also wrestled dark matches for NWA Total Nonstop Action, and competed for Texas All Star Wrestling, Extreme Texas Wrestling and NWA Southwest. He also toured Japan on numerous occasions and worked for Ring of Honor in 2003, joining Team Texas (Texas Wrestling Academy) Don Juan, Fast Eddie led by TWA head trainer Rudy Boy Gonzalez facing the Carnage Crew in a violent feud that lasted several months.

In 2001, Hernandez began wrestling for the National Wrestling Alliance. At the October 13, 2001 NWA Anniversary Show in St. Petersburg, Florida, he defeated Kevin Northcutt to win the NWA National Heavyweight Championship. He held the title for over a year before losing to Ricky Murdock on January 11, 2003, in Greenville, Missouri. Hernandez defeated Jorge Estrada for the NWA North American Heavyweight Championship on May 3, 2003, in Cornelia, Georgia. On September 28, 2003, in Hawaii, he lost the title to J.T. Wolfen.

=== NWA Total Nonstop Action (2003–2004) ===
Hernandez debuted in NWA Total Nonstop Action on the November 22, 2003, episode of TNA Xplosion, losing to Shane Douglas. He returned to TNA on June 16, 2004, as one-third of the "Elite Guard", a trio of mercenaries working for Jeff Jarrett after his first King of the Mountain match victory. The Elite Guard (Hernandez, Chad Collyer and Onyx) feuded with the 3Live Kru over the next two months. On July 14, 2004, Jarrett, the Elite Guard and Ken Shamrock lost to Dusty Rhodes, Larry Zbyszko and the 3Live Kru in a ten-man tag team bout. The Elite Guard remained with TNA until September 2004, when all three wrestlers were released.

=== Return to TNA (2006–2014) ===
==== Latin American Xchange (2006–2009) ====
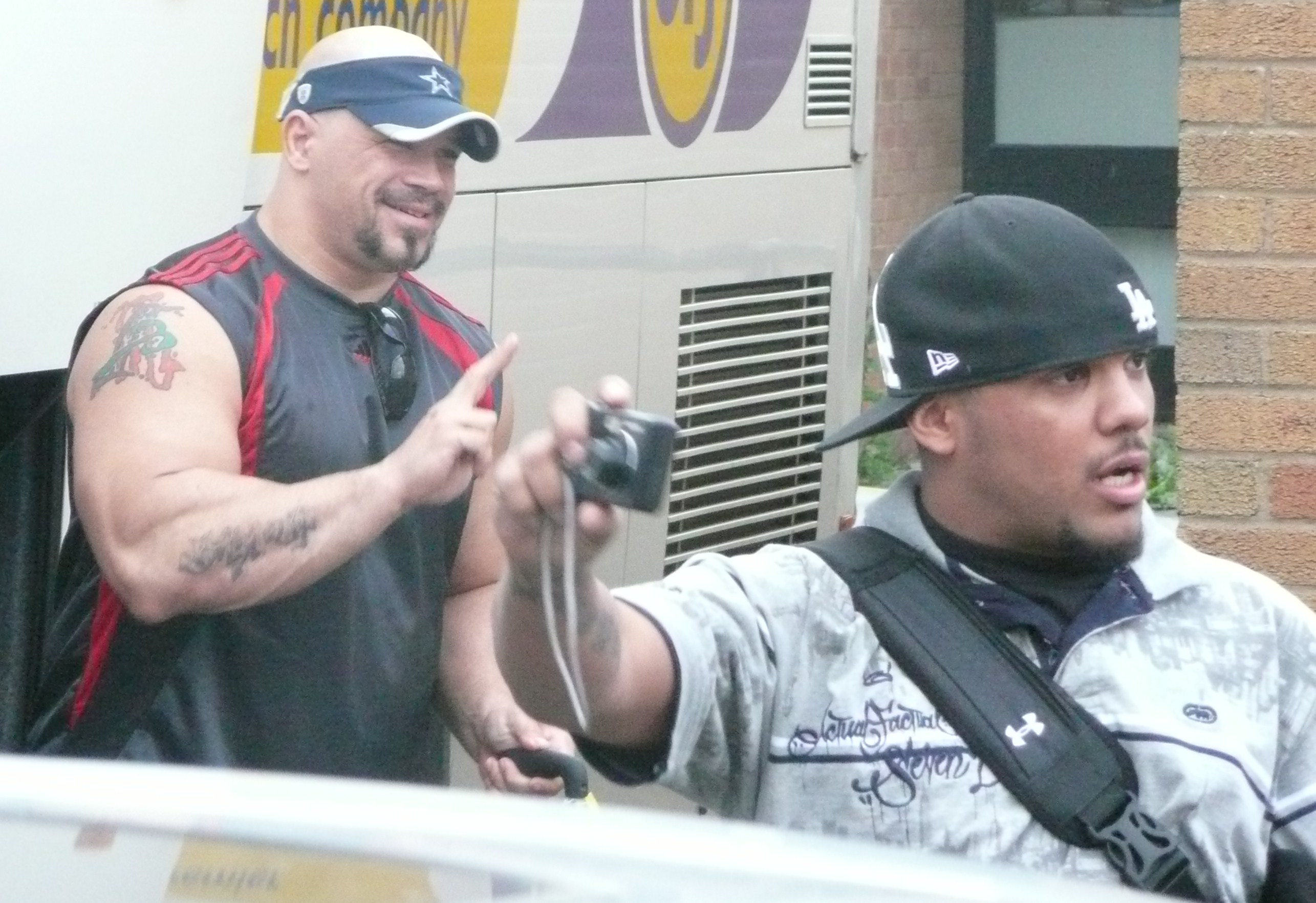
Hernandez (left) and Homicide after a Total Nonstop Action Wrestling event

In March 2006, Hernandez signed a new contract with Total Nonstop Action Wrestling. He returned on the March 31, 2006, episode of TNA Xplosion as the newest member of the heel stable The Latin American Xchange (LAX), teaming with Homicide and being managed by Konnan. On the August 24, 2006, episode of TNA Impact!, Hernandez and Homicide defeated A.J. Styles and Christopher Daniels in a Border Brawl for the NWA World Tag Team Championship. Styles and Daniels regained the title from Hernandez and Homicide in an Ultimate X match on September 24, 2006, at No Surrender, but Hernandez and Homicide won the title back on October 22, 2006, at Bound for Glory inside the Six Sides of Steel. After winning the title back, they engaged in a feud with America's Most Wanted, defeating them in a match at Genesis and then a flag match at Turning Point. Their next rivalry involved Team 3D (Brother Devon and Brother Ray), and, after winning three consecutive matches at Final Resolution (by disqualification), Against All Odds (in a Little Italy Street fight) and Destination X (in a Ghetto Brawl), lost the NWA tag-team championships to Team 3D at Lockdown in an Electrified Cage match, when Homicide was pinned. When Konnan left TNA in the summer of 2007, both Hernandez and Homicide turned face and at Bound for Glory defeated Senshi and Elix Skipper of Triple X in an Ultimate X match to get back in the tag team title picture. They would receive their shot at the TNA World Tag Team Championship on the November 1 episode of Impact!, but were defeated by the defending champions A.J. Styles and Tomko.

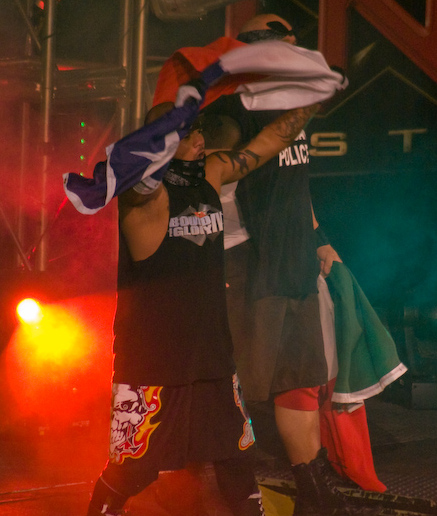
Hernandez and Homicide making their entrance at Bound for Glory IV in 2008

In 2008 LAX got another title shot by beating Rock 'n Rave Infection (Jimmy Rave and Lance Rock) and The Motor City Machine Guns (Alex Shelley and Chris Sabin) at Destination X and cashed it in during a three-way match on the April 17 episode of Impact! against the Tag Team Champions A.J. Styles and Tomko and the team that ended up winning the match, Eric Young/Super Eric and Kaz. The controversial ending of this match led to the title being vacated and being put up for grabs in a tournament. At Sacrifice, LAX, with their new manager Hector Guerrero in their corner, won the vacant TNA World Tag Team Championship, after defeating Team 3D in the finals of the "Deuces Wild Tournament". LAX lost the title at Hard Justice to Beer Money, Inc. (James Storm and Robert Roode).

At the second Final Resolution pay-per-view of 2008, both Hernandez and Homicide each captured a briefcase from the "Feast or Fired" match which contained a shot at the TNA World Heavyweight Championship for Hernandez and a shot at the TNA X Division Championship for Homicide. On a January 15 episode of TNA Impact, Hernandez cashed in his "Feast or Fired" World Title shot against Sting, and won by disqualification when The Main Event Mafia interfered, which meant that he did not win the title. However, executive shareholder Mick Foley ruled that because of the interference Hernandez would receive another TNA Title Shot in the future. On the April 30, episode of Impact!, Hernandez was attacked by the debuting British Invasion faction of Brutus Magnus, Doug Williams and Rob Terry, to allow him time off to recover from a legitimate neck surgery.

On the July 23 episode of Impact! Hernandez returned to aid Homicide, who was being attacked by Samoa Joe and Taz. A week later, on July 30, he defeated Joe in his return match with a top rope splash. At Hard Justice Hernandez regained his "Feast or Fired" briefcase from the British Invasion by defeating Rob Terry in nine seconds. On the September 10 episode of Impact!, Homicide turned heel by betraying Hernandez and joining World Elite, thus signaling the official end of the Latin American Xchange. At No Surrender Hernandez cashed in his "Feast or Fired" briefcase, but was unable to win the World Heavyweight Championship in the 5-way main event match after World Elite leader Eric Young interfered and took him out of the match. At Bound for Glory, Hernandez was unsuccessful in capturing the TNA Legends Championship in a three-way match, involving champion Kevin Nash and Eric Young, after Young turned on Nash and captured the title.

==== Teaming and feuding with Matt Morgan (2010–2011) ====
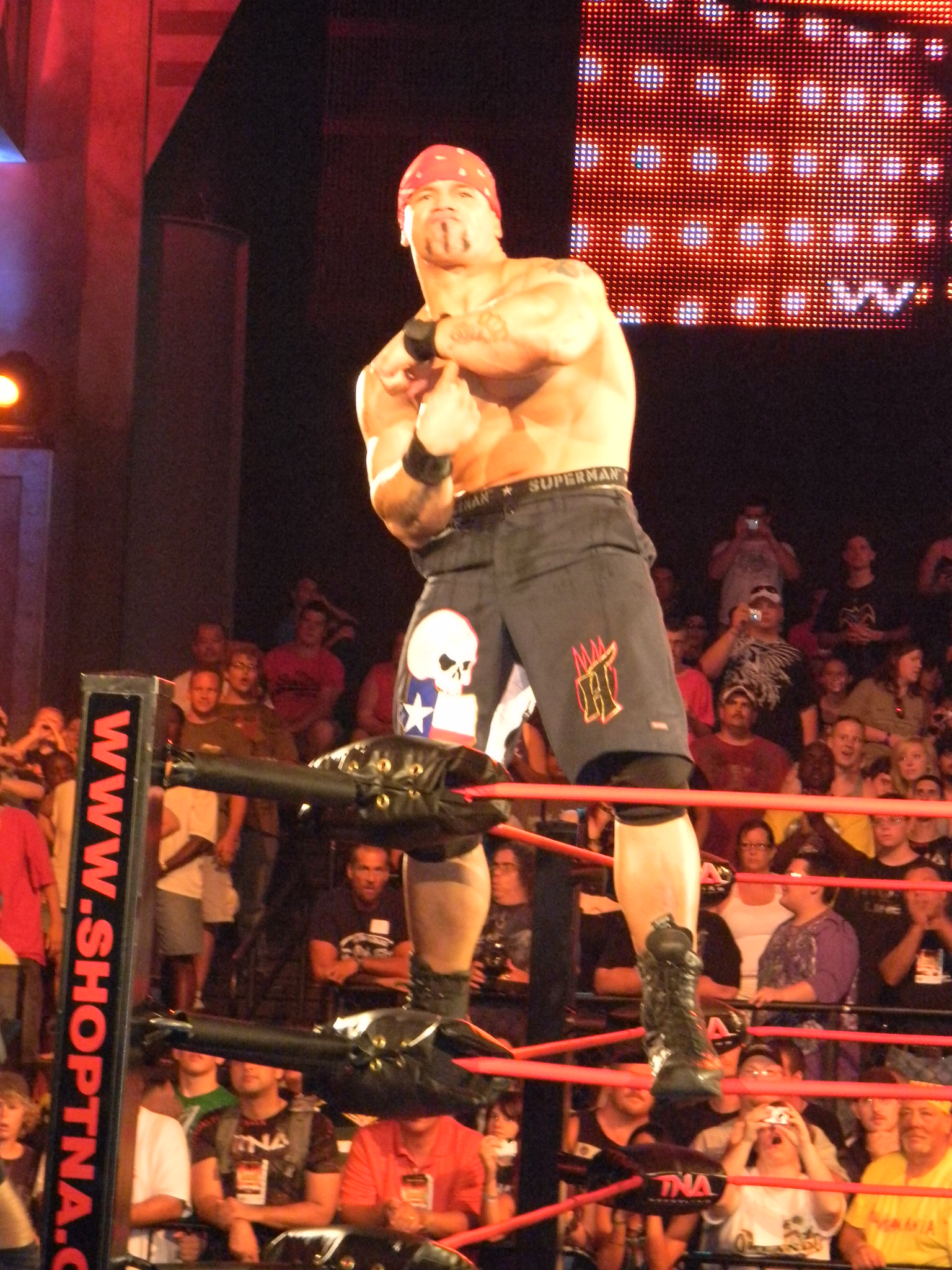
Hernandez posing in 2010

In late-2009, Hernandez teamed up with Matt Morgan and D'Angelo Dinero and moved on to feuding with Rhino and Team 3D, who accused TNA of favoring the younger talent of the company. At Turning Point Rhino and Team 3D defeated Morgan, Hernandez and Dinero in a street fight. At Final Resolution Morgan, Hernandez, Dinero and Suicide defeated Neal, Team 3D and Rhino in an eight-man elimination tag team match. On the January 4, 2010, live, three-hour, Monday night episode of Impact! Hernandez and Morgan defeated Dr. Stevie and Raven to become the number one contenders to the TNA World Tag Team Champions British Invasion. At Genesis Hernandez and Morgan defeated the British Invasion to win the TNA World Tag Team Championship. At Against All Odds as part of the 8 Card Stud Tournament Hernandez and Morgan were forced to face each other in the first round. Morgan defeated Hernandez by taking advantage of his injured shoulder and pinning him, while grabbing a hold of his trunks. At Destination X Hernandez and Morgan retained the Tag Team Title in a match against Beer Money despite plenty of miscommunication between the two champions. After the match Morgan nailed Hernandez with the Carbon Footprint. The following day on Impact! Morgan defeated Hernandez via referee stoppage after sandwiching his head between his boot and the ring post. After the match Homicide came out to check on his former partner, who was being helped by medics. TNA later reported on Hernandez's kayfabe injuries, claiming that he had suffered a herniated disc and cervical damage to his neck in the assault and will be out of action indefinitely. The neck injury storyline was created so Hernandez could work in Mexico for three months.

With Hernandez scheduled to miss months of action, Morgan declared himself the sole World Tag Team Champion on the April 5 episode of Impact! and TNA went along with this and no longer recognized Hernandez as a champion.

Hernandez's return to TNA was hinted at on the June 3 episode of Impact!, when Matt Morgan was distracted by somebody in the crowd which cost him a four-way match with Samoa Joe, Sting and the winner of the match, TNA World Heavyweight Champion Rob Van Dam. The camera's immediately showed what was distracting Morgan, but nobody could clearly see who it was, although Taz and Mike Tenay believed it to be Hernandez. The following week, Hernandez made his official return by attacking Morgan, leading to a match between the two at Slammiversary VIII. The match at Slammiversary VIII ended in Hernandez being disqualified for assaulting the referee, when he was being reprimanded for going too violently after Morgan. The following month at Victory Road Hernandez defeated Morgan in a Steel Cage match to end the feud. In November it was reported that Hernandez had turned down TNA's request for him to return to the promotion from his stint in Mexico.

==== Mexican America (2011–2012) ====
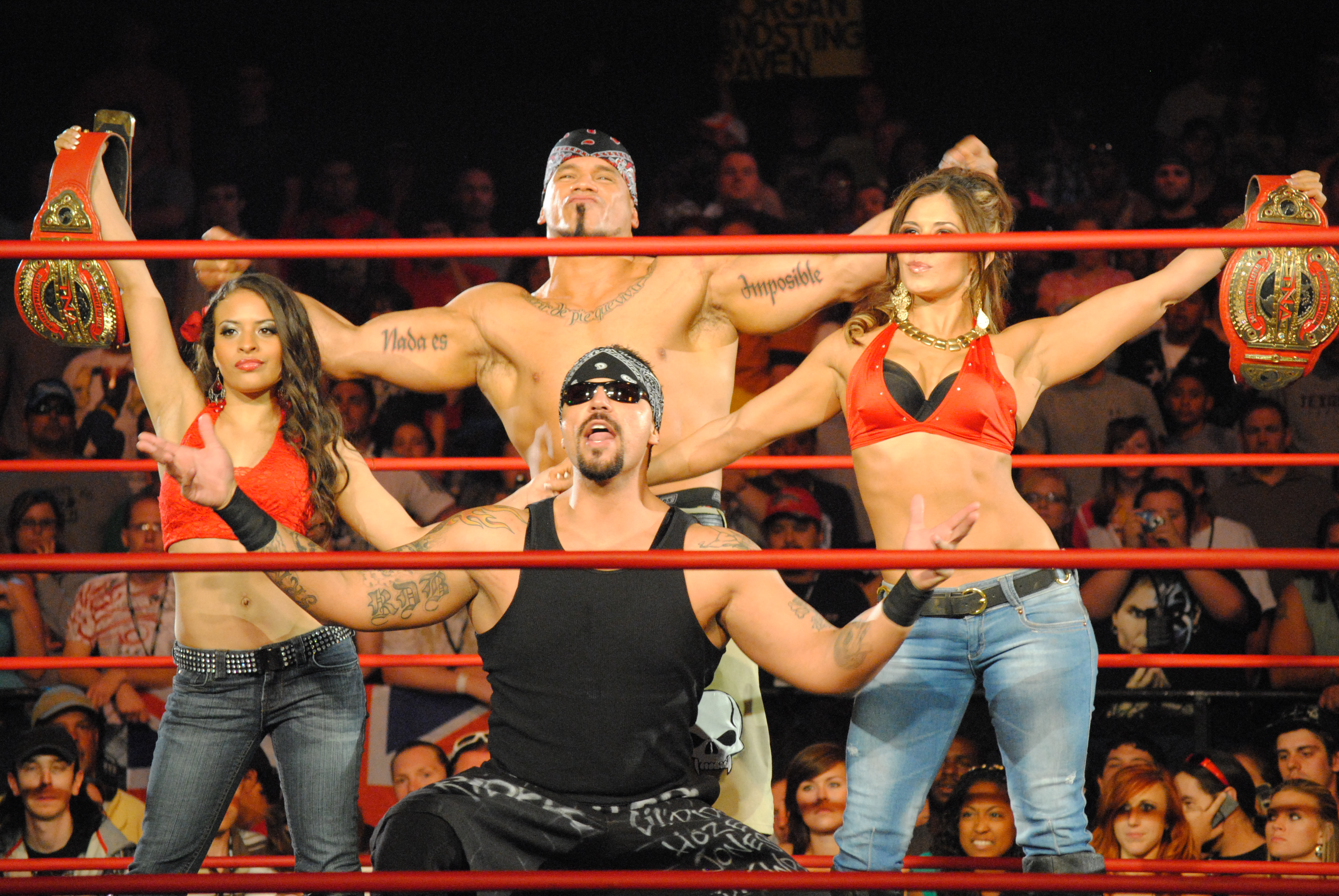
Mexican America in March 2011

Hernandez returned to TNA from his stint in Mexico at the February 1, 2011, tapings of the February 10 episode of Impact!. He made his return as a heel, when he was hired by Eric Bischoff to "hurt a few people" for his Immortal stable. Hernandez then re–ignited his feud with the now–face Matt Morgan by costing him the TNA World Heavyweight Championship in a match against Mr. Anderson. On February 13 at Against All Odds Hernandez explained the change in his attitude by claiming that in the United States he was treated like a second class citizen, while in Mexico he was treated like a star. On the following episode of Impact!, Hernandez aligned himself with Sarita and Rosita. On the March 3 episode of Impact! Hernandez was defeated by Morgan via disqualification. On March 13 at Victory Road, Hernandez defeated Morgan in a First Blood match, after using fake blood on him, following a run–in from a planted fan. On the following episode of Impact!, the alliance of Hernandez, Sarita and Rosita was named Mexican America. The three of them were then defeated in a six-person street fight by Morgan, Angelina Love and Winter. After the match, the "fan", who had interfered in the match at Victory Road, once again entered the ring and attacked Morgan. On the March 24 episode of Impact!, he was officially presented as the newest member of Mexican America and named Anarquia. According to Hernandez, the original plan was to find a partner in Mexico, but TNA decided to include Anarquia as his tag team partner. On April 17 at Lockdown, Morgan defeated Hernandez in a steel cage match to win the feud. After defeating Ink Inc. (Jesse Neal and Shannon Moore) at Sacrifice and the team of Alex Shelley and TNA World Tag Team Champion James Storm on the June 9 episode of Impact Wrestling, Hernandez and Anarquia began demanding a tag team title shot, claiming that they were held back because of their race. On the July 14 episode of Impact Wrestling, Hernandez and Anarquia defeated The British Invasion (Douglas Williams and Magnus), with help from Rosita, to become the number one contenders to the TNA World Tag Team Championship. Hernandez and Anarquia received their shot at the TNA World Tag Team Championship on August 7 at Hardcore Justice, but were defeated by the defending champions, Beer Money, Inc. Two days later, at the tapings of the August 18 episode of Impact Wrestling, Hernandez and Anarquia defeated Beer Money, Inc. in a rematch, following interference from the "Mexican Heavyweight Champion" Jeff Jarrett, to win the TNA World Tag Team Championship. On September 11 at No Surrender, Hernandez and Anarquia successfully defended the title against D'Angelo Dinero and Devon, following interference from Rosita and Sarita. Later that month, Mexican America began feuding with Ink Inc., stemming from their match at Sacrifice in May, where Hernandez had legitimately injured Jesse Neal. On October 16, during the Bound for Glory Preshow, Mexican America successfully defended the TNA World Tag Team Championship against Ink Inc. The following month at Turning Point, Anarquia, Hernandez and Sarita defeated Ink Inc.'s Jesse Neal, Shannon Moore and Toxxin in a six-person tag team match to retain the TNA World Tag Team Championship. On the following episode of Impact Wrestling, Hernandez and Anarquia lost the TNA World Tag Team Championship to Crimson and Matt Morgan. On the following episode of Impact Wrestling, Hernandez and Arnaquia failed to regain the title in a rematch. After spending three months off television, Hernandez returned on the March 22, 2012, episode of Impact Wrestling, when he and Anarquia unsuccessfully challenged Magnus and Samoa Joe for the TNA World Tag Team Championship. In April, Anarquia was released from his TNA contract, thus ending his partnership with Hernandez. According to Hernandez, TNA wanted to create a more stereotypical stable, but Hernandez refused to use Mexican jargon, so TNA gave the promos to Anarquia. Hernandez said Mexican America was the worst part of his career and the stable was doomed from the beginning.

==== Teaming with Chavo Guerrero (2012–2014) ====
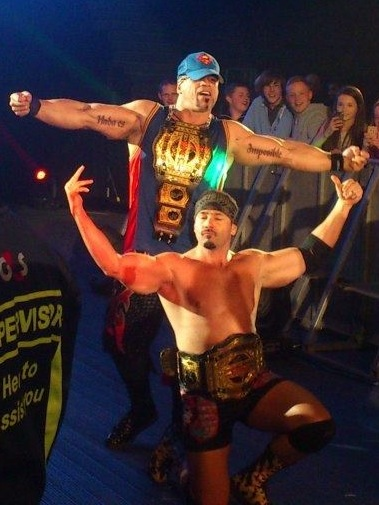
Hernandez and Chavo Guerrero as TNA World Tag Team Champions

Following Anarquia's departure, Hernandez remained inactive, before returning on June 10 at Slammiversary, which took place in his home state of Texas, defeating Kid Kash in a singles match. On the following episode of Impact Wrestling, Hernandez unsuccessfully challenged Devon for the TNA Television Championship. On June 28, Hernandez confirmed that he had signed a one-year contract extension with TNA.

On the July 26 episode of Impact Wrestling, Hernandez aligned himself with the debuting Chavo Guerrero by saving him from Gunner and Kid Kash. On August 12 at Hardcore Justice, Hernandez and Guerrero defeated Gunner and Kash in a tag team match. On the September 6 episode of Impact Wrestling, Hernandez and Guerrero, after being hand-picked by Hulk Hogan as the number one contenders, unsuccessfully challenged Christopher Daniels and Kazarian for the TNA World Tag Team Championship. On October 14 at Bound for Glory, Hernandez and Guerrero defeated Daniels and Kazarian, and A.J. Styles and Kurt Angle in a three-way match to become the new TNA World Tag Team Champions. Hernandez and Guerrero made their first title defense on November 11 at Turning Point, defeating Daniels and Kazarian in rematch to retain their titles. On December 9 at Final Resolution, Hernandez and Guerrero retained the World Tag Team Championship against Joey Ryan and Matt Morgan via disqualification. Hernandez and Guerrero then defeated Ryan and Morgan again on January 13, 2013, at Genesis, to retain their titles. On January 25, at the tapings of the January 31 episode of Impact Wrestling in Manchester, England, Hernandez and Guerrero lost the TNA World Tag Team Championship to Austin Aries and Bobby Roode, ending their reign at 103 days.

Hernandez and Guerrero received their rematch for the titles on March 10 at Lockdown, but were again defeated by Aries and Roode in a three-way match, also involving Bad Influence (Christopher Daniels and Kazarian). On following episode of Impact Wrestling, Hernandez and Guerrero were set for another shot at the titles, but the two were ambushed by the Aces & Eights before the match could start. The title match took place the following week, where Hernandez and Guerrero failed again to regain the TNA World Tag Team Championship, following interference from Daniels and Kazarian. On the next episode of Impact Wrestling, Hernandez and Guerrero defeated Daniels and Kazarian to earn another shot at the TNA World Tag Team Championship. Hernandez and Guerrero received their title shot on the April 11 episode of Impact Wrestling, where they defeated Aries and Roode in a Two-out-of-Three Falls match, with the added stipulation that they would have to break up if they lost, to regain the TNA World Tag Team Championship. On the April 25 episode of Impact Wrestling, Hernandez and Guerrero successfully defended their titles against Aries and Roode in rematch after an inadvertent interference from Christopher Daniels and Kazarian. On June 2 at Slammiversary XI, Hernandez and Guerrero lost the TNA World Tag Team Championship to Gunner and James Storm in a fatal four-way elimination match, also involving Austin Aries and Bobby Roode and Bad Influence. On the following episode of Impact Wrestling, Hernandez defeated Guerrero to qualify for the 2013 Bound for Glory Series. On the July 4 episode of Impact Wrestling, Hernandez defeated Jay Bradley after an interference from Guerrero via pinfall to earn seven points in the tournament. at Bound for Glory, Hernandez and Guerrero competed in a Gauntlet match to determine #1 contenders to the TNA World Tag Team Championship which was won by The BroMans. Their alliance ended on December 19, when Guerrero was fired, and afterwards Hernandez took time off from TNA.

On May 12, 2014, Hernandez was fired from TNA. According to Hernandez, TNA never notified him of his release and he noticed it via internet.

=== Lucha Libre AAA World Wide (2006; 2010) ===
==== Debut (2006) ====
Hernandez made his debut for Mexican promotion Lucha Libre AAA World Wide (AAA) on August 12, 2006, at Guerra de Titanes, appearing as a member of the rudo (heel) stable La Legión Extranjera (The Foreign Legion) in a six-man tag team match, where he, Elix Skipper and Headhunter A were defeated by El Alebrije, La Parka and Octagón via disqualification.

==== Return; La Legión Extranjera (2010) ====
In early 2010 TNA restarted their working relationship with AAA in order to send Hernandez to the company for an extended stay to gain exposure in front of the Mexican audience and make him a bigger star. Hernandez returned to the company on March 12, 2010, at Rey de Reyes, entering the Rey de Reyes tournament as a surprise competitor and defeating El Elegido, Crazy Boy and Kenzo Suzuki in the semifinal four-way elimination match to make his way to the finals. Later in the night Hernandez turned rudo and once again aligned himself with La Legión Extranjera by attacking Cibernético after his match with Legión leader Konnan. In the Rey de Reyes final three-way elimination match Hernandez was the first man eliminated at the hands of Marco Corleone. Despite his elimination, Hernandez stayed at ringside and in the end cost Corleone the match against Legión member Chessman. Hernandez then began portraying an anti-Mexican character, refusing to speak or even acknowledge he could understand Spanish and doing his interviews through an interpreter. On June 6 at Triplemanía XVIII Hernandez and fellow Legión members Alex Koslov and Chessman represented referee Hijo del Tirantes in a six-man tag team steel cage match, where they defeated Heavy Metal, Octagón and Pimpinela Escarlata, representing referee Pierro, with the hair of the referees on the line. In the summer of 2010, La Legión Extranjera joined forces with Los Perros del Mal, La Milicia and Los Maniacos to form La Sociedad, under the leadership of Dorian Roldan, while Hernandez began regularly teaming with his Legión stablemate El Zorro. On August 26 Hernandez took part in a major angle, when he, Alex Koslov and Decnnis interrupted a Smashing Pumpkins concert for MTV World Stage. Hernandez went to Border Toss lead singer Billy Corgan, before being stopped and driven away by La Parka, El Mesías and Extreme Tiger. On October 1 in the main event of Héroes Inmortales IV, Hernandez represented La Sociedad in an eight-man elimination steel cage match, where he, El Zorro, Electroshock and L.A. Park were defeated by AAA representatives Dark Cuervo, Dark Ozz, Heavy Metal and La Parka. In November, while El Zorro moved on to battling for the AAA Mega Championship, Hernandez formed a new tag team with La Legión Extranjera's newest member, Puerto Rican El Ilegal. On December 5 at Guerra de Titanes Hernandez and El Ilegal faced Los Maniacos (Silver King and Último Gladiador) and La Hermandad 187 (Nicho el Millonario and Joe Líder) in a ladder match for the AAA World Tag Team Championship, but were unable to capture the title. Hernandez finished his run with AAA on December 21, 2010.

=== Lucha Underground (2014–2015) ===
Hernandez debuted on Lucha Underground in a dark match against Ricky Mandel on October 15, 2014, defeating him. Hernandez returned on other dark matches. On January 17, 2015, Hernandez teamed up with Jeff Cobb defeating The Crew (Cortez Castro, Mr. Cisco and Bael) on a Dark Handicap Tag 3 on 2. Then he teamed again with Jeff Cobb and Argenis defeating Mariachi Loco & Ricky Mandel and Son of Havoc on a Dark 6-Person Tag. Hernandez's last dark match was a 5-Way match defeating Jeff Cobb, Marty Martinez, Killshot and Willie Mack. However Hernandez's first televised appearance was on Episode 20 that aired on March 25, 2015. He was aligned with Konnan and Lucha Underground Champion Prince Puma. However, on his first televised match Cage, King Cuerno and Texano, Jr. Defeated Hernandez, Johnny Mundo & Prince Puma on a 6-Person Tag. On April 29, 2015, Hernandez defeated King Cuerno and Cage in a Three-Way to win an opportunity for Puma's title. On May 6, 2015, Hernandez turned on Puma when he left alone in a match against Cage and King Cuerno. On May 13, 2015, Hernandez retained his title match against Alberto el Patrón. On May 27, 2015, he unsuccessfully challenged Prince Puma for the Championship. On June 10, 2015 Drago Defeated Cage, Hernandez, King Cuerno on a Four-Way match and become the number one contender to the Lucha Underground Championship. Soon after, Hernandez faced Drago and lost via disqualification, before a rematch between the rivals would be announced for the upcoming Ultima Lucha event. A week later they both faced each other In an Atomicos Tag Team Match. Hernandez, Jack Evans, Johnny Mundo and Super Fly Defeated Aero Star, Alberto el Patrón, Drago and Sexy Star. At the first night of Ultima Lucha, Drago defeated Hernandez in a Believer's Backlash Match.

=== Second return to TNA (2015) ===
Hernandez returned to TNA on June 24, 2015, attacking the Rising and joining the Beat Down Clan. However, in July, following a legal dispute between TNA and Lucha Underground regarding Hernandez's contract, he was released from the company, and the Beat Down Clan was pulled from television. Hernandez had reportedly claimed he was a free agent before being signed by TNA, despite never actually receiving his release from Lucha Underground.

=== Independent circuit (2014–2020) ===
On June 19, 2014, Hernandez made his Chikara debut, taking part in the 2014 King of Trios tournament alongside Chavo Guerrero and Homicide. They were defeated in their first round match by the Golden Trio (Dasher Hatfield, Icarus and Mark Angelosetti). In October 2014, Hernandez appeared in World Wrestling Council, attacking Ray Gonzalez under Ricardo Rodríguez's orders.

Hernandez was slated to return to Texas All-Star Wrestling on June 25, 2016, in Cypress, Texas. Prior to the show, he was involved in altercations with both "Killer" Brent McKenzie and Byron "Big Daddy Yum Yum" Wilcott. Hernandez left the building and did not compete.

Hernandez took on Kenzo Richards at Cheltenham Town Hall on February 18, 2018, for World Pro Wrestling.

Since around 2018, Hernandez has been working with Austin Wrestling Revolution based in Lockhart, TX as head trainer of the AWR Wrestling Academy, producing and booking, as well as wrestling.

=== Lucha Underground (2018) ===
In February 2018, Hernandez made his return to Lucha Underground at Aztec Warfare IV on the first episode of Season 4 competing in the Aztec Warfare entering at number 10 but was soon eliminated by pinfall by Pentagon Dark. He left Lucha Underground once more in October 2018.

=== Third return to TNA/Impact Wrestling (2018) ===
Hernandez made his return to TNA, now known as Impact Wrestling, on the July 5, 2018, episode of Impact, aligning himself with King and former tag team partner Homicide, attacking Latin American Xchange members Konnan, Ortiz and Santana. They later became known as The OGz. At Slammiversary XVI, they faced LAX for the Impact Tag Team Championship in a Street Fight, but they lost. In their next two appearances, they defeated jobbers, while keeping their feud with LAX alive. Then they challenged LAX again, this time in a Concrete Jungle Death at Bound for Glory in a match that they lost again. After several months, Hernandez moved to alumni section.

=== Fourth return to Impact Wrestling (2020-2022) ===
On the April 14, 2020, episode of Impact!, Hernandez made his return to Impact Wrestling, where he defeated Rohit Raju. At Rebellion, he was defeated by Moose in a three-way match also involving Michael Elgin. Hernandez then aligned himself with Johnny Swinger, accompanying him to matches and teaming with him. At Bound for Glory in October 2020, Hernandez competed in the Call Your Shot Gauntlet match which was won by Rhino. He wrestled his final match for the promotion in January 2022. On March 20, 2022, it was reported that Hernandez was finished with Impact Wrestling.

=== Late career (2022–present) ===
After leaving Impact Wrestling in March 2022, Hernandez returned to the independent circuit. According to his official Facebook page, Shawn Hernandez serves as the head coach at San Antonio Style Wrestling, a professional wrestling school located in San Antonio, Texas.

== Other media ==
Hernandez has appeared in the video games TNA iMPACT! and TNA Wrestling Impact!.

== Championships and accomplishments ==
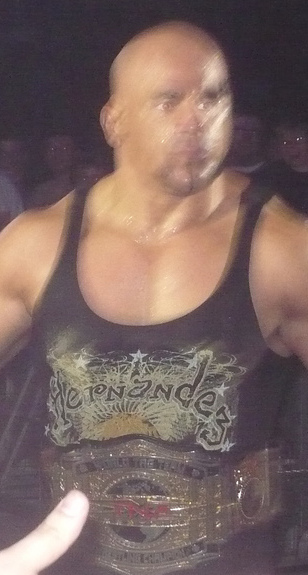
Hernandez is a five-time TNA World Tag Team Champion

- European Wrestling Promotion
  - EWP World Heavyweight Championship (2 times)
- Extreme Texas Wrestling
  - ETW Texas Championship (1 time)
- Federacion Internacional de Lucha Libre
  - FILL Heavyweight Championship (1 time)
- Full Effect Wrestling
  - FEW Heavyweight Championship (1 time)
- Full Global Alliance Wrestling
  - FGAW Heavyweight Championship (1 time)
- International Wrestling Association
  - IWA World Tag Team Championship (1 time) – with Homicide
- Jersey All Pro Wrestling
  - JAPW Tag Team Championship (1 time) – with Homicide
- NWA Florida
  - NWA National Heavyweight Championship (1 time)
- NWA Southwest
  - NWA Texas Heavyweight Championship (3 times)
- NWA Wildside
  - NWA North American Heavyweight Championship (1 time)
  - NWA Wildside Heavyweight Championship (1 time)
- Pure Action Championship Wrestling
  - PACW Heavyweight Championship (1 time)
- Pro Wrestling Illustrated
  - Ranked No. 55 of the top 500 singles wrestlers in the PWI 500 in 2011
- River City Wrestling
  - RCW Championship (3 times)
  - RCW Tag Team Championship (4 times) – with Ryan Genesis (1), Michael Faith (1) Joey Spector (1) and Homicide (1)
- Texas All-Star Wrestling
  - TASW Heavyweight Championship (1 time)
  - TASW Hardcore Championship (1 time)
  - TASW Tag Team Championship (1 time) – with Ministuff
- Texas Wrestling Entertainment
  - TWE Heavyweight Championship (1 time)
- Total Nonstop Action Wrestling
  - NWA World Tag Team Championship (2 times) – with Homicide
  - TNA World Tag Team Championship (5 times) – with Homicide (1), Matt Morgan (1), Anarquia (1) and Chavo Guerrero Jr. (2)
  - Feast or Fired (2008 – World Heavyweight Championship contract)
  - Deuces Wild Tag Team Tournament (2008) – with Homicide
  - TNA Year End Award (1 time)
    - Match of the Year (2006) with Homicide vs. A.J. Styles and Christopher Daniels at No Surrender
- Wrestling Observer Newsletter
  - Best Gimmick (2006) with Homicide as The Latin American Xchange
  - Tag Team of the Year (2006) with Homicide as The Latin American Xchange
- XCW Wrestling
  - XCW Heavyweight Championship (1 time)
  - XCW TNT Championship (1 time)
