= Knuth reward check =

Awards issued by computer scientist Donald Knuth

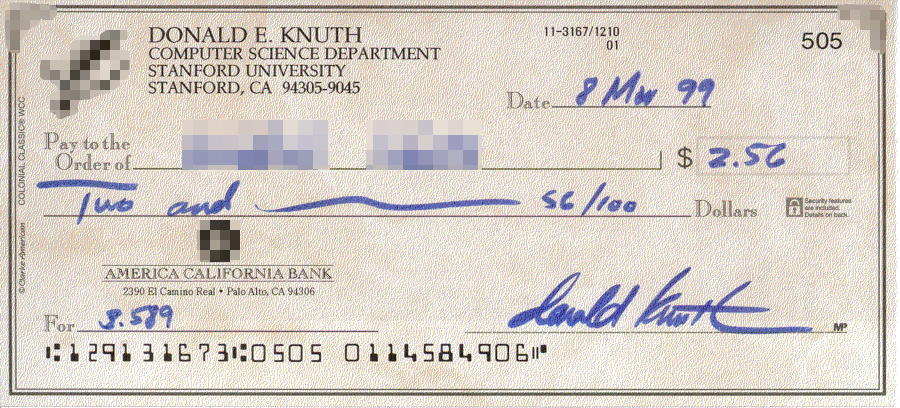
One of Donald Knuth's personally-designed reward checks, with the recipient's name and design details censored to deter forgeries

Knuth reward checks are checks or check-like certificates awarded by computer scientist Donald Knuth for finding technical, typographical, or historical errors, or making substantial suggestions for his publications. The MIT Technology Review describes the checks as "among computerdom’s most prized trophies."

== Background ==
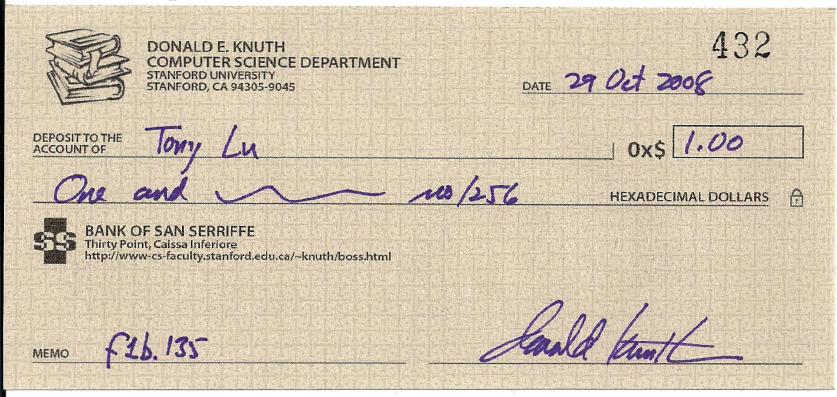
Bank of San Serriffe reward check

Knuth started rewarding people for discovering errors in his books after he published the first volume of The Art of Computer Programming in 1968. Initially, Knuth sent real, negotiable checks to recipients. He stopped doing so in October 2008 because of problems with check fraud. As a replacement, he started his own "Bank of San Serriffe", in the fictional nation of San Serriffe, which keeps an account for everyone who found an error since 2006. Knuth now sends out "hexadecimal certificates" instead of negotiable checks.

As of October 2001, Knuth reported having written more than 2,000 checks, with an average value exceeding $8 per check. By March 2005, the total value of the checks signed by Knuth was over $20,000. Very few of these checks were actually cashed, even the largest ones. More often they have been framed and kept as a valued keepsake.

Intelligence: Finding an error in a Knuth text. Stupidity: Cashing that $2.56 check you got.

— Seen in a Slashdot signature, quoted by Tess O'Connor

== Reward amounts ==
In the preface of each of his books and on his website, Knuth offers a reward of $2.56 (USD) to the first person to find each error in his published books, whether it be technical, typographical, or historical. Knuth explains that $2.56, or 256 cents, corresponds to one hexadecimal dollar. Valuable suggestions are worth 32 cents, or 1/8 the value of an error (0.2 hexadecimal dollars or 20 hexadecimal cents). In his earlier books a smaller reward was offered. For example, the 2nd edition of The Art of Computer Programming, Volume 1, offered $2.00.

The reward for coding errors found in Knuth's TeX and Metafont programs (as distinguished from errors in Knuth's books) followed a unique scheme inspired by the wheat and chessboard problem, starting at $2.56, and doubling every year until it reached $327.68. Recipients of this "progressive reward" reward include Chris Thompson (Cambridge) and Bogusław L. Jackowski (Gdańsk), and also Peter Breitenlohner on 20 March 1995.

Each check's memo field identifies the book and page number. 1.23 indicates an error on page 23 of Volume 1. (1.23) indicates a valuable suggestion on that page. The symbol Θ denotes the book Things a Computer Scientist Rarely Talks About, KLR denotes the book Mathematical Writing (by Knuth, Larrabee, and Roberts), GKP and CM denote the book Concrete Mathematics (by Graham, Knuth, and Patashnik), f1 denotes fascicle 1, CMT denotes the book Computer Modern Typefaces, DT denotes the book Digital Typography, SN denotes Surreal Numbers, CWEB denotes the book The CWEB System of Structured Documentation, DA denotes the book Selected Papers on Design of Algorithms, FG denotes the book Selected Papers on Fun and Games, and MM denotes the book MMIXware - A RISC Computer for the Third Millennium.

== Processing delays ==
Knuth is often unable to answer immediately when a reader finds a mistake in one of his books or programs. In some cases, the delay has been several years. For example, on 1 July 1996, Knuth sent out more than 250 letters, 125 of which contained checks, for errors reported in The Art of Computer Programming since the summer of 1981. A few of these remain unclaimed as of May 2006. When Knuth is not able to reply immediately, he adds 5% interest, compounded continuously, to the reward.

== See also ==
- List of computer-related awards
- Erdős's problems
