= Oren Patashnik =

American computer scientist

Oren Patashnik (born 1954) is an American computer scientist. He co-created BibTeX, and co-authored Concrete Mathematics: A Foundation for Computer Science.

While working at Bell Labs in 1980, Patashnik proved that Qubic can always be won by the first player. Using 1500 hours of computer time, Patashnik's proof is an early example of a computer-assisted proof.

In 1985, Patashnik created the bibliography-system, BibTeX, in collaboration with Leslie Lamport, the creator of LaTeX. LaTeX is a system and programming language for formatting documents, which is especially designed for mathematical documents. BibTeX is a widely used bibliography-formatting tool for LaTeX.

Patashnik assisted Ronald Graham and Donald Knuth in writing the 1988 textbook Concrete Mathematics: A Foundation for Computer Science.

Patashnik became a doctoral student of Andrew Yao at Stanford University, where he completed his Ph.D. in 1990.
