= Knuth's Simpath algorithm =

Simpath is an algorithm introduced by Donald Knuth that constructs a zero-suppressed decision diagram (ZDD) representing all simple paths between two vertices in a given graph.
