= Donald Knuth =

American computer scientist and mathematician (born 1938)

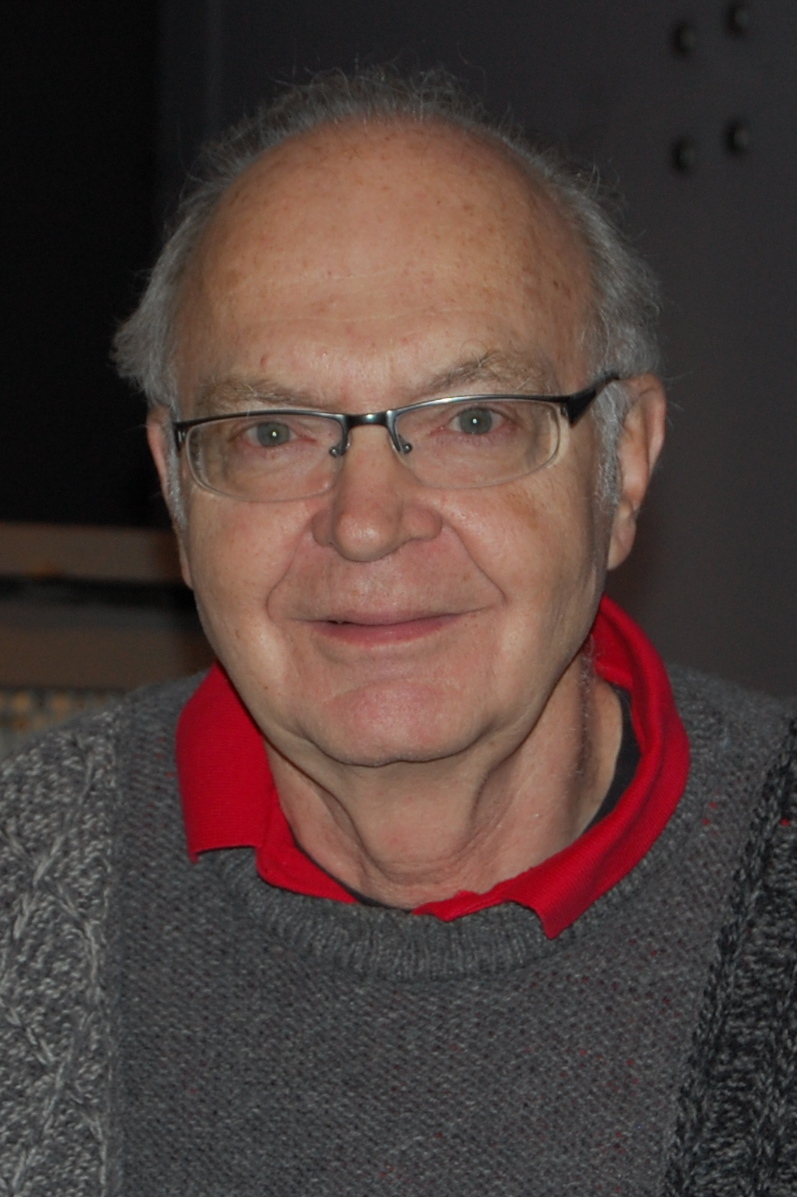
- Knuth in 2011
- Born: Donald Ervin Knuth; January 10, 1938 (age 88); Milwaukee, Wisconsin, U.S.
- Education: Case Western Reserve University (BS, MS); California Institute of Technology (PhD)
- Known for: See list: The Art of Computer Programming, TeX, METAFONT, Computer Modern, Knuth's up-arrow notation, Knuth–Morris–Pratt algorithm, Knuth–Bendix completion algorithm, MMIX, Robinson–Schensted–Knuth correspondence, LR parser, Literate programming
- Spouse: Nancy Jill Carter
- Children: 2
- Awards: See list: SIGCSE Outstanding Contribution (1986); Grace Murray Hopper Award (1971); Turing Award (1974); Member of the National Academy of Sciences (1975); National Medal of Science (1979); John von Neumann Medal (1995); Harvey Prize (1995); Kyoto Prize (1996); Foreign Member of the Royal Society (2003); Faraday Medal (2011); BBVA Foundation Frontiers of Knowledge Award (2010); Turing Lecture (2011); Flajolet Lecture (2014)
- Scientific career
- Fields: Mathematics; Computer science
- Workplaces: California Institute of Technology, Stanford University
- Thesis: Finite Semifields and Projective Planes (1963)
- Doctoral advisor: Marshall Hall, Jr.
- Doctoral students: Leonidas J. Guibas; Michael Fredman; Scott Kim; Vaughan Pratt; Robert Sedgewick; Jeffrey Vitter; Andrei Broder
- Website: cs.stanford.edu/~knuth

Donald Ervin Knuth (/kəˈnuːθ/ kə-NOOTH; born January 10, 1938) is an American computer scientist and mathematician. He is a professor emeritus at Stanford University. He is the 1974 recipient of the ACM Turing Award, informally considered the Nobel Prize of computer science. Knuth has been called the "father of the analysis of algorithms".

Knuth is the author of the multi-volume work The Art of Computer Programming. He contributed to the development of the rigorous analysis of the computational complexity of algorithms and systematized formal mathematical techniques for it. In the process, he also popularized the asymptotic notation. In addition to fundamental contributions in several branches of theoretical computer science, Knuth is the creator of the TeX computer typesetting system, the related METAFONT font definition language and rendering system, and the Computer Modern family of typefaces.

As a writer and scholar, Knuth created the WEB and CWEB computer programming systems designed to encourage and facilitate literate programming, and designed the MIX/MMIX instruction set architectures. He strongly opposes the granting of software patents, and has expressed his opinion to the United States Patent and Trademark Office and European Patent Organisation.

== Biography ==
=== Early life ===
Donald Knuth was born in Milwaukee, Wisconsin, to Ervin Henry Knuth and Louise Marie Bohning. He describes his heritage as "Midwestern Lutheran German". His father owned a small printing business and taught bookkeeping. While a student at Milwaukee Lutheran High School, Knuth thought of ingenious ways to solve problems. For example, in eighth grade, he entered a contest to find the number of words that the letters in "Ziegler's Giant Bar" could be rearranged to create; the judges had identified 2,500 such words. With time gained away from school due to a fake stomach ache, Knuth used an unabridged dictionary and determined whether each dictionary entry could be formed using the letters in the phrase. He identified over 4,500 words, winning the contest. As prizes, the school received a new television and enough candy bars for all of his schoolmates to eat.

=== Education ===
Knuth received a scholarship in physics to the Case Institute of Technology (now part of Case Western Reserve University) in Cleveland, Ohio, enrolling in 1956. He also joined the Beta Nu Chapter of the Theta Chi fraternity. While studying physics at Case, Knuth was introduced to the IBM 650, an early commercial computer. After reading the computer's manual, Knuth decided to rewrite the assembly and compiler code for the machine used in his school because he believed he could do it better.

In 1958, Knuth created a program to help his school's basketball team win its games. He assigned "values" to players in order to gauge their probability of scoring points, a novel approach that Newsweek and CBS Evening News later reported on.

Knuth was one of the founding editors of the Case Institute's Engineering and Science Review, which won a national award as best technical magazine in 1959. He then switched from physics to mathematics, and received two degrees from Case in 1960: his Bachelor of Science, and simultaneously a master of science by a special award of the faculty, who considered his work exceptionally outstanding.

At the end of his senior year at Case in 1960, Knuth proposed to Burroughs Corporation to write an ALGOL compiler for the B205 for $5,500. The proposal was accepted and he worked on the ALGOL compiler between graduating from Case and going to Caltech.

In 1963, with mathematician Marshall Hall as his adviser, he earned a PhD in mathematics from the California Institute of Technology, with a thesis titled Finite Semifields and Projective Planes.

=== Early work ===
In 1963, after receiving his PhD, Knuth joined Caltech's faculty as an assistant professor.

While at Caltech and after the success of the Burroughs B205 ALGOL compiler, he became consultant to Burroughs Corporation, joining the Product Planning Department. At Caltech he was operating as a mathematician, but at Burroughs as a programmer, working with the people he considered to have written the best software at the time: the ALGOL compiler for the B220 computer (successor to the B205).

Knuth turned down a $100,000 contract to write compilers at Green Tree Corporation, deciding instead to optimize income and continue at Caltech and Burroughs. He received a National Science Foundation Fellowship and Woodrow Wilson Foundation Fellowship, but they had the condition that the recipient could not do anything else but study as a graduate student, so he would not be able to continue as a consultant to Burroughs. He chose to turn down the fellowships and continued with Burroughs. In summer 1962, he wrote a FORTRAN compiler for Univac, but considered that "I sold my soul to the devil" to write a FORTRAN compiler.

After graduating, Knuth returned to Burroughs in June 1961, but did not tell them he had graduated with a master's degree, rather than the expected bachelor's degree. Impressed by the ALGOL syntax chart, symbol table, recursive-descent approach, and the separation of the scanning, parsing, and emitting functions of the compiler, Knuth suggested an extension to the symbol table: that one symbol could stand for a string of symbols. This became the basis of the DEFINE in Burroughs ALGOL, which has since been adopted by other languages. However, some really disliked the idea and wanted DEFINE removed. The last person to think it was a terrible idea was Edsger Dijkstra on a visit to Burroughs.

Knuth worked on simulation languages at Burroughs, producing SOL 'Simulation Oriented Language', an improvement on the state-of-the-art, co-designed with J. McNeeley. He attended a conference in Norway in May 1967, organized by the people who invented the Simula language. Knuth influenced Burroughs to use Simula. Knuth had a long association with Burroughs as a consultant from 1960 to 1968 until his move into more academic work at Stanford in 1969.

In 1962, Knuth accepted a commission from Addison-Wesley to write a book on computer programming language compilers. While working on this project, he decided that he could not adequately treat the topic without first developing a fundamental theory of computer programming, which became The Art of Computer Programming. He originally planned to publish this as a single book, but as he developed his outline for the book, he concluded that he required six volumes, and then seven, to thoroughly cover the subject. He published the first volume in 1968.

Just before publishing the first volume of The Art of Computer Programming, Knuth left Caltech to accept employment with the Institute for Defense Analyses' Communications Research Division, then situated on the Princeton campus, which was performing mathematical research in cryptography to support the National Security Agency.

In 1967, Knuth attended a Society for Industrial and Applied Mathematics conference and someone asked what he did. At the time, computer science was partitioned into numerical analysis, artificial intelligence, and programming languages. Based on his study and The Art of Computer Programming book, Knuth decided the next time someone asked he would say, "Analysis of algorithms".

In 1969, Knuth left his position at Princeton to join the Stanford University faculty, where he became Fletcher Jones Professor of Computer Science in 1977. He became Professor of The Art of Computer Programming in 1990, and has been emeritus since 1993.

== Writings ==
Knuth is a writer as well as a computer scientist.

=== The Art of Computer Programming (TAOCP) ===
"The best way to communicate from one human being to another is through story."

— Donald Knuth

In the 1970s, Knuth called computer science "a totally new field with no real identity. And the standard of available publications was not that high. A lot of the papers coming out were quite simply wrong. ... So one of my motivations was to put straight a story that had been very badly told."

From 1972 to 1973, Knuth spent a year at the University of Oslo among people such as Ole-Johan Dahl. This is where he had originally intended to write the seventh volume in his book series, which was to deal with programming languages. But Knuth had finished only the first two volumes when he came to Oslo, and thus spent the year on the third volume, next to teaching. The third volume came out just after Knuth returned to Stanford in 1973.

Concrete Mathematics: A Foundation for Computer Science originated with an expansion of the mathematical preliminaries section of Volume 1 of TAOCP. Knuth found that there were mathematical tools necessary for Volume 1, but missing from his repertoire, and decided that a course introducing those tools to computer science students would be useful. Knuth introduced the course at Stanford in 1970. Course notes developed by Oren Patashnik evolved into the 1988 text, with authors Ronald Graham, Knuth, and Patashnik. A second edition of Concrete Mathematics was published in 1994.

By 2011, Volume 4A of TAOCP had been published. In April 2020, Knuth said he anticipated that Volume 4 of TAOCP will have at least parts A through F. Volume 4B was published in October 2022.

=== Other works ===
Knuth is also the author of Surreal Numbers, a mathematical novelette on John Horton Conway's set theory construction of an alternate system of numbers. Instead of simply explaining the subject, the book seeks to show the development of the mathematics. Knuth wanted the book to prepare students for doing original, creative research.

In 1995, Knuth wrote the foreword to the book A=B by Marko Petkovšek, Herbert Wilf and Doron Zeilberger. He also occasionally contributes language puzzles to Word Ways: The Journal of Recreational Linguistics.

Knuth has delved into recreational mathematics. He contributed articles to the Journal of Recreational Mathematics beginning in the 1960s, and was acknowledged as a major contributor in Joseph Madachy's Mathematics on Vacation.

Knuth also appears in a number of Numberphile and Computerphile videos on YouTube, where he discusses topics from writing Surreal Numbers to why he does not use email.

Knuth has proposed the name "algorithmics" as a better name for the discipline of computer science.

Knuth has made a substantial contribution to the study of the Stable matching problem.

=== Works about his religious beliefs ===
In addition to his writings on computer science, Knuth, a Lutheran, is also the author of 3:16 Bible Texts Illuminated, in which he examines the Bible by a process of systematic sampling, namely an analysis of chapter 3, verse 16 of each book. Each verse is accompanied by a rendering in calligraphic art, contributed by a group of calligraphers led by Hermann Zapf. Knuth was invited to give a set of lectures at MIT on the views on religion and computer science behind his 3:16 project, resulting in another book, Things a Computer Scientist Rarely Talks About, where he published the lectures God and Computer Science.

=== Opinion on software patents ===
Knuth strongly opposes granting software patents to trivial solutions that should be obvious, but has expressed more nuanced views for nontrivial solutions such as the interior-point method of linear programming. He has expressed his disagreement directly to both the United States Patent and Trademark Office and European Patent Organisation.

== Programming ==
=== Digital typesetting ===
In the 1970s, the publishers of TAOCP abandoned Monotype in favor of phototypesetting. Knuth became so frustrated with the inability of the latter system to approach the quality of the previous volumes, which were typeset using the older system, that he took time out to work on digital typesetting and created TeX and Metafont.

=== Literate programming ===
While developing TeX, Knuth created a new methodology of programming, which he called literate programming, because he believed that programmers should think of programs as works of literature:

Instead of imagining that our main task is to instruct a computer what to do, let us concentrate rather on explaining to human beings what we want a computer to do.

Knuth embodied the idea of literate programming in the WEB system. The same WEB source is used to weave a TeX file, and to tangle a Pascal source file. These in their turn produce a readable description of the program and an executable binary respectively. A later iteration of the system, CWEB, replaces Pascal with C, C++, and Java.

Knuth used WEB to program TeX and METAFONT, and published both programs as books, both originally published the same year: TeX: The Program (1986); and METAFONT: The Program (1986). Around the same time, LaTeX, the now-widely adopted macro package based on TeX, was first developed by Leslie Lamport, who later published its first user manual in 1986.

== Personal life ==
Donald Knuth married Nancy Jill Carter on 24 June 1961, while he was a graduate student at the California Institute of Technology. They have two children: John Martin Knuth and Jennifer Sierra Knuth.

Knuth gives informal lectures a few times a year at Stanford University, which he calls "Computer Musings". He was a visiting professor at the Oxford University Department of Computer Science in the United Kingdom until 2017 and an Honorary Fellow of Magdalen College.

Knuth is an organist and a composer. He and his father served as organists for Lutheran congregations. Knuth originally planned on majoring in music at the Lutheran Valparaiso University, before ultimately attending Case. Knuth and his wife have a 16-rank organ in their home. In 2016 he completed a piece for organ, Fantasia Apocalyptica, which he calls a "translation of the Greek text of the Revelation of Saint John the Divine into music". It was premièred in Sweden on January 10, 2018.

Knuth's Chinese name is Gao Dena (simplified Chinese: 高德纳; traditional Chinese: 高德納; pinyin: Gāo Dénà). He was given this name in 1977 by Frances Yao shortly before making a three-week trip to China. In the 1980 Chinese translation of Volume 1 of The Art of Computer Programming (simplified Chinese: 计算机程序设计艺术; traditional Chinese: 計算機程式設計藝術; pinyin: Jìsuànjī chéngxù shèjì yìshù), Knuth explains that he embraced his Chinese name because he wanted to be known by the growing numbers of computer programmers in China at the time. In 1989, his Chinese name was placed atop the Journal of Computer Science and Technology's header, which Knuth says "makes me feel close to all Chinese people although I cannot speak your language".

=== Humor ===
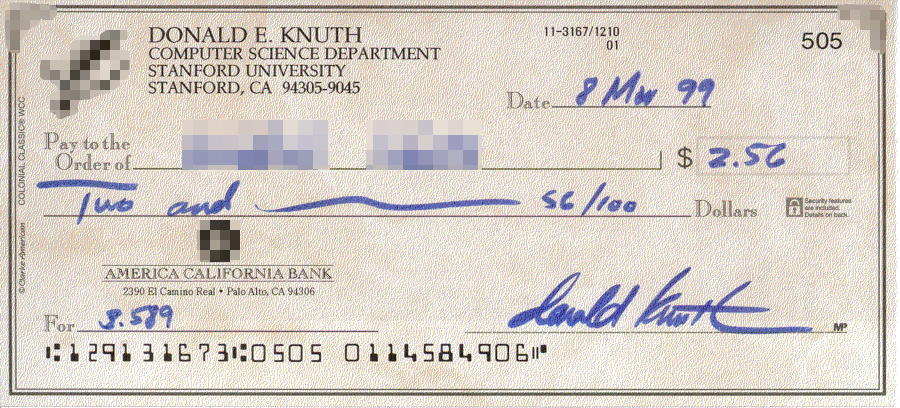
One of Knuth's reward checks

Knuth used to pay a finder's fee of $2.56 for any typographical errors or mistakes discovered in his books, because "256 pennies is one hexadecimal dollar", and $0.32 for "valuable suggestions". According to an article in the Massachusetts Institute of Technology's Technology Review, these Knuth reward checks are "among computerdom's most prized trophies". Knuth had to stop sending real checks in 2008 due to bank fraud, and now gives each error finder a "certificate of deposit" from a publicly listed balance in his fictitious "Bank of San Serriffe".

He once warned a correspondent, "Beware of bugs in the above code; I have only proved it correct, not tried it."

Knuth published his first "scientific" article in a school magazine in 1957 under the title "The Potrzebie System of Weights and Measures". In it, he defined the fundamental unit of length as the thickness of Mad No. 26, and named the derived unit of power "whatmeworry". Mad published the article in issue No. 33 (June 1957).

To demonstrate the concept of recursion, Knuth intentionally referred "Circular definition" and "Definition, circular" to each other in the index of The Art of Computer Programming, Volume 1.

The preface of Concrete Mathematics has the following paragraph:

When DEK taught Concrete Mathematics at Stanford for the first time, he explained the somewhat strange title by saying that it was his attempt to teach a math course that was hard instead of soft. He announced that, contrary to the expectations of his colleagues, he was not going to teach the Theory of Aggregates, nor Stone's Embedding Theorem, nor even the Stone–Čech compactification. (Several students from the civil engineering department got up and quietly left the room.)

At the TUG 2010 Conference, Knuth announced a satirical XML-based successor to TeX, titled "iTeX" (pronounced [iː˨˩˦tɛks˧˥⸨bell⸩], spoken while ringing a bell), which would support features such as arbitrarily scaled irrational units, 3D printing, input from seismographs and heart monitors, animation, and stereophonic sound.

== Awards and honors ==
In 1971, Knuth received the first ACM Grace Murray Hopper Award. He has received various other awards, including the Turing Award, the Leroy P. Steele Prize, the National Medal of Science, the John von Neumann Medal, and the Kyoto Prize.

Knuth was elected a Distinguished Fellow of the British Computer Society (DFBCS) in 1980 in recognition of his contributions to the field of computer science.

Since 1980, Knuth has been awarded over thirty honoris causa doctoral degrees from various international colleges across fifteen countries, including the University of Paris-Sud (Orsay) (1986), Valparaiso University (1988), the University of Oxford (1988), Concordia University (1991), and the Royal Institute of Technology (1991).

In 1990, he was awarded the one-of-a-kind academic title Professor of The Art of Computer Programming; the title has since been revised to Professor Emeritus of The Art of Computer Programming.

Knuth was elected to the National Academy of Sciences in 1975. He was also elected a member of the National Academy of Engineering in 1981 for organizing vast subject areas of computer science so that they are accessible to all segments of the computing community. In 1992, he became an associate of the French Academy of Sciences. Also that year, he retired from regular research and teaching at Stanford University in order to finish The Art of Computer Programming. In 1996, he was awarded the degree of Doctor Honoris Causa in the field of Mathematical Sciences from the Faculty of Informatics of Masaryk University in Brno. He was elected a Foreign Member of the Royal Society in 2003.

Knuth was elected as a Fellow (first class of Fellows) of the Society for Industrial and Applied Mathematics in 2009 for his outstanding contributions to mathematics. He is a member of the Norwegian Academy of Science and Letters. In 2012, he became a fellow of the American Mathematical Society and a member of the American Philosophical Society. Other awards and honors include:

- First ACM Grace Murray Hopper Award, 1971
- Turing Award, 1974
- Lester R. Ford Award, 1975 and 1993
- Josiah Willard Gibbs Lecturer, 1978
- National Medal of Science, 1979
- Golden Plate Award of the American Academy of Achievement, 1985
- American Mathematical Society Leroy P. Steele Prize, 1986
- Franklin Medal, 1988
- John von Neumann Medal, 1995
- Harvey Prize from the Technion, 1995
- Kyoto Prize, 1996
- Fellow of the Computer History Museum "for his fundamental early work in the history of computing algorithms, development of the TeX typesetting language, and for major contributions to mathematics and computer science." 1998
- Asteroid 21656 Knuth, named in his honor in May 2001
- Katayanagi Prize for Research Excellence (Carnegie Mellon), 2010
- BBVA Foundation Frontiers of Knowledge Award in the category of Information and Communication Technologies, 2010
- Turing Lecture, 2011
- Stanford University School of Engineering Hero Award, 2011
- Flajolet Lecture Prize, 2014

== Publications ==
A short list of his publications include:

The Art of Computer Programming:

1. ——— (1997). The Art of Computer Programming. Vol. 1: Fundamental Algorithms (3rd ed.). Addison-Wesley Professional. ISBN 978-0-201-89683-1.
2. ——— (1997). The Art of Computer Programming. Vol. 2: Seminumerical Algorithms (3rd ed.). Addison-Wesley Professional. ISBN 978-0-201-89684-8.
3. ——— (1998). The Art of Computer Programming. Vol. 3: Sorting and Searching (2nd ed.). Addison-Wesley Professional. ISBN 978-0-201-89685-5.
4. ——— (2011). The Art of Computer Programming. Vol. 4A: Combinatorial Algorithms, Part 1. Addison-Wesley Professional. ISBN 978-0-201-03804-0.
5. ——— (2022). The Art of Computer Programming. Vol. 4B: Combinatorial Algorithms, Part 2. Addison-Wesley Professional. ISBN 978-0-201-03806-4.
6. ——— (2005). MMIX—A RISC Computer for the New Millennium. Vol. 1, Fascicle 1. Pearson Education. ISBN 978-0-201-85392-6.
7. ——— (2008). The Art of Computer Programming. Vol. 4, Fascicle 0: Introduction to Combinatorial Algorithms and Boolean Functions. Addison-Wesley. ISBN 978-0-321-53496-5.
8. ——— (2009). The Art of Computer Programming. Vol. 4, Fascicle 1: Bitwise Tricks & Techniques, Binary Decision Diagrams. Addison-Wesley. ISBN 978-0-321-58050-4.
9. ——— (2005). The Art of Computer Programming. Vol. 4, Fascicle 2: Generating All Tuples and Permutations. Addison-Wesley. ISBN 978-0-201-85393-3.
10. ——— (2005). The Art of Computer Programming. Vol. 4, Fascicle 3: Generating All Combinations and Partitions. Addison-Wesley. ISBN 978-0-201-85394-0.
11. ——— (2006). The Art of Computer Programming. Vol. 4, Fascicle 4: Generating All Trees—History of Combinatorial Generation. Addison-Wesley. ISBN 978-0-321-33570-8.
12. ——— (2018). The Art of Computer Programming. Vol. 4, Fascicle 5: Mathematical Preliminaries Redux, Backtracking, Dancing Links. Addison-Wesley. ISBN 978-0-134-67179-6.
13. ——— (2015). The Art of Computer Programming. Vol. 4, Fascicle 6: Satisfiability. Addison-Wesley. ISBN 978-0-134-39760-3.
14. ——— (2025). The Art of Computer Programming. Vol. 4, Fascicle 7: Constraint Satisfaction. Addison-Wesley. ISBN 978-0-135-32824-8.

Computers and Typesetting (all books are hardcover unless otherwise noted):

1. ——— (1984). Computers & Typesetting. Vol. A, The TeXbook. Reading, MA: Addison-Wesley. ISBN 978-0-201-13447-6., x+483pp.
2. ——— (1984). Computers & Typesetting. Vol. A, The TeXbook. Reading, MA: Addison-Wesley. ISBN 978-0-201-13448-3. (softcover).
3. ——— (1986). Computers & Typesetting. Vol. B, TeX: The Program. Reading, MA: Addison-Wesley. ISBN 978-0-201-13437-7., xviii+600pp.
4. ——— (1986). Computers & Typesetting. Vol. C, The METAFONTbook. Reading, MA: Addison-Wesley. ISBN 978-0-201-13445-2., xii+361pp.
5. ——— (1986). Computers & Typesetting. Vol. C, The METAFONTbook. Reading, MA: Addison-Wesley. ISBN 978-0-201-13444-5. (softcover).
6. ——— (1986). Computers & Typesetting. Vol. D, METAFONT: The Program. Reading, MA: Addison-Wesley. ISBN 978-0-201-13438-4., xviii+566pp.
7. ——— (1986). Computers & Typesetting. Vol. E, Computer Modern Typefaces. Reading, MA: Addison-Wesley. ISBN 978-0-201-13446-9., xvi+588pp.
8. ——— (2000). Computers & Typesetting. Vol. A-E Boxed Set. Reading, MA: Addison-Wesley. ISBN 978-0-201-73416-4.

Books of collected papers:

1. ——— (1992). Literate Programming. Lecture Notes. Stanford, CA: Center for the Study of Language and Information—CSLI. ISBN 978-0-937073-80-3.
2. ——— (1996). Selected Papers on Computer Science. Lecture Notes. Stanford, CA: Center for the Study of Language and Information—CSLI. ISBN 978-1-881526-91-9.
3. ——— (1999). Digital Typography. Lecture Notes. Stanford, CA: Center for the Study of Language and Information—CSLI. ISBN 978-1-57586-010-7.
4. ——— (2000). Selected Papers on Analysis of Algorithms. Lecture Notes. Stanford, CA: Center for the Study of Language and Information—CSLI. ISBN 978-1-57586-212-5.
5. ——— (2003). Selected Papers on Computer Languages. Lecture Notes. Stanford, CA: Center for the Study of Language and Information—CSLI. ISBN 978-1-57586-381-8., ISBN 1-57586-382-0 (paperback)
6. ——— (2003). Selected Papers on Discrete Mathematics. Lecture Notes. Stanford, CA: Center for the Study of Language and Information—CSLI. ISBN 978-1-57586-249-1., ISBN 1-57586-248-4 (paperback)
7. Donald E. Knuth, Selected Papers on Design of Algorithms (Stanford, California: Center for the Study of Language and Information—CSLI Lecture Notes, no. 191), 2010. ISBN 1-57586-583-1 (cloth), ISBN 1-57586-582-3 (paperback)
8. Donald E. Knuth, Selected Papers on Fun and Games (Stanford, California: Center for the Study of Language and Information—CSLI Lecture Notes, no. 192), 2011. ISBN 978-1-57586-585-0 (cloth), ISBN 978-1-57586-584-3 (paperback)
9. Donald E. Knuth, Companion to the Papers of Donald Knuth (Stanford, California: Center for the Study of Language and Information—CSLI Lecture Notes, no. 202), 2011. ISBN 978-1-57586-635-2 (cloth), ISBN 978-1-57586-634-5 (paperback)

Other books:

1. Graham, Ronald L; Knuth, Donald E.; Patashnik, Oren (1994). Concrete mathematics: A foundation for computer science (Second ed.). Reading, MA: Addison-Wesley. ISBN 978-0-201-55802-9. MR 1397498. xiv+657 pp.
2. Knuth, Donald Ervin (1974). Surreal numbers: how two ex-students turned on to pure mathematics and found total happiness: a mathematical novelette. Addison-Wesley. ISBN 978-0-201-03812-5.
3. Donald E. Knuth, The Stanford GraphBase: A Platform for Combinatorial Computing (New York, ACM Press) 1993. second paperback printing 2009. ISBN 0-321-60632-9
4. Donald E. Knuth, 3:16 Bible Texts Illuminated (Madison, Wisconsin: A-R Editions), 1990. ISBN 0-89579-252-4
5. Donald E. Knuth, Things a Computer Scientist Rarely Talks About (Center for the Study of Language and Information—CSLI Lecture Notes no 136), 2001. ISBN 1-57586-326-X
6. Donald E. Knuth, MMIXware: A RISC Computer for the Third Millennium (Heidelberg: Springer-Verlag— Lecture Notes in Computer Science, no. 1750), 1999. viii+550pp. ISBN 978-3-540-66938-8
7. Donald E. Knuth and Silvio Levy, The CWEB System of Structured Documentation (Reading, Massachusetts: Addison-Wesley), 1993. iv+227pp. ISBN 0-201-57569-8. Third printing 2001 with hypertext support, ii + 237 pp.
8. Donald E. Knuth, Tracy L. Larrabee, and Paul M. Roberts, Mathematical Writing (Washington, D.C.: Mathematical Association of America), 1989. ii+115pp ISBN 978-0883850633
9. Daniel H. Greene and Donald E. Knuth, Mathematics for the Analysis of Algorithms (Boston: Birkhäuser), 1990. viii+132pp. ISBN 978-0817647285
10. Donald E. Knuth, Mariages Stables: et leurs relations avec d'autres problèmes combinatoires (Montréal: Les Presses de l'Université de Montréal), 1976. 106pp. ISBN 978-0840503428
11. Donald E. Knuth, Stable Marriage and Its Relation to Other Combinatorial Problems: An Introduction to the Mathematical Analysis of Algorithms. ISBN 978-0821806036
12. Donald E. Knuth, Axioms and Hulls (Heidelberg: Springer-Verlag—Lecture Notes in Computer Science, no. 606), 1992. ix+109pp. ISBN 3-540-55611-7

== See also ==
- -yllion
- Attribute grammar
- CC system
- Dancing links
- Knuth–Bendix completion algorithm
- Knuth Prize
- Knuth's Algorithm X
- Knuth's Simpath algorithm
- Knuth's up-arrow notation
- Knuth–Morris–Pratt algorithm
- Davis–Knuth dragon
- Bender–Knuth involution
- TPK algorithm
- Fisher–Yates shuffle
- Robinson–Schensted–Knuth correspondence
- Man or boy test
- Plactic monoid
- Quater-imaginary base
- Triangular number
- The Complexity of Songs
- Uniform binary search
- List of pioneers in computer science
- List of scholars on the relationship between religion and science

== Bibliography ==
- Knuth, Donald Ervin. "Home page". Stanford University.
- Knuth, Donald Ervin. "The Art of Computer Programming (TAOCP)".
- Platoni, Kara; Archibald, Timothy (May–June 2006). "Love at First Byte". Stanford Magazine. Archived from the original on September 25, 2006.
