= Things a Computer Scientist Rarely Talks About =

2001 book by Donald Knuth

- Paperback edition
- Author: Donald E. Knuth
- Language: English
- Subject: Computer Science and Religion
- Publisher: Center for the Study of Language and Information, Stanford, California
- Publication date: 2001
- Publication place: United States
- Media type: Hardcover, Paperback
- Pages: 257 pp.
- ISBN: 978-1-57586-326-9 (paperback), ISBN 978-1-57586-327-6 (hardcover)
- OCLC: 439524141

Things a Computer Scientist Rarely Talks About (2001) is a book by Donald E. Knuth, published by CSLI Publications of Stanford, California. The book contains the annotated transcripts of six public lectures given by Donald E. Knuth at MIT on the subject of relations between religion and science (particularly computer science). Knuth gives credence to the concept of divinity.

== Contents ==
Anne Foerst wrote a foreword for the book. The six chapters are lightly edited transcriptions of Knuth's lectures:

- Lecture 1: Introduction
- Lecture 2: Randomization and Religion
- Lecture 3: Language Translation
- Lecture 4: Aesthetics
- Lecture 5: Glimpses of God
- Lecture 6: God and Computer Science

Knuth added a final section entitled "Panel: Creativity, Spirituality, and Computer Science".

== Excerpts from reviews ==
One mark of a good author is the ability to make a successful book out of an unpromising subject. Over the years, Donald E. Knuth has produced a slew of bestsellers on topics that might seem to have only limited appeal, most notably the arts of computer programming and mathematical typography. His latest book takes on a subject so challenging it has to hide behind a coy title: Things a Computer Scientist Rarely Talks About (CSLI Publications, $35). What is this subject that dare not speak its name? Not sex, but religion. The book is based on a series of lectures on "interactions between faith and computer science". The main topic is Knuth's approach to Bible study through random sampling (which led to an earlier book as well, titled 3:16); there is also musing on the programmer's role as god of a created universe. It's a very unpromising subject, but Knuth is a very good author.

If you are a fan of 3:16 and want to know more about the statistical techniques Knuth employed, his aesthetic considerations, how he translated the 59 verses without knowing Hebrew or Greek, or what he learned in the process of this project—or if you simply want merely to spend time with a remarkable, playful intellect—you'll enjoy this book. If you want to know how computer science might help theological reflection, lecture six can launch you on your way to further, challenging study.

Despite many enjoyable passages, the book ultimately disappoints. While I can imagine that the lectures might have been wonderful to listen to, their verbatim transcription to the printed page does not always work well. A large fraction of the lectures centered around Knuth's study of selected verses from the Bible, but the written version comes across as repetitious, with many uninteresting details. Knuth's analysis of the verses is not deep and not particularly informed by a scientific sensibility. And too many of the questions in the question-and-answer sessions were superficial and could have been edited.

== Notes ==
ISBN 1-57586-327-8 (hardcover), ISBN 1-57586-326-X (paperback)
